= Bleaching on the Lawn =

Painting by Max Liebermann

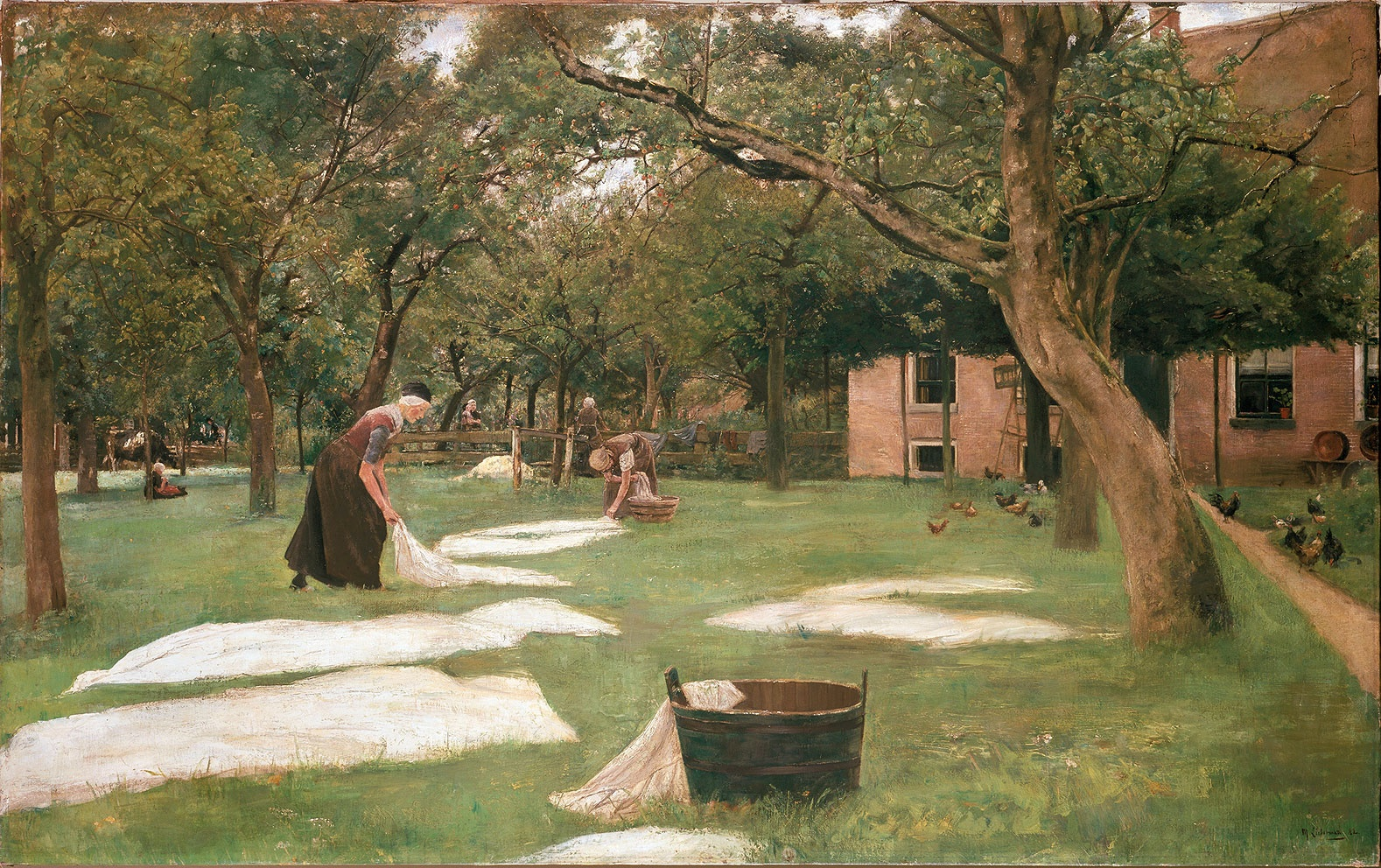
- Artist: Max Liebermann
- Year: 1882–1883
- Medium: oil on canvas
- Movement: Realism
- Dimensions: 109 cm × 173 cm (43 in × 68 in)
- Location: Wallraf-Richartz-Museum, Cologne

Bleaching on the Lawn is an oil-on-canvas painting executed in 1882–83 by the German painter Max Liebermann. It depicts a scene that takes place in a Dutch cottage garden in Zweeloo, in the province of Drenthe, in North Holland, where several washerwomen are laying out large white linen towels to dry and bleach. The painting is in the collection of the Wallraf-Richartz-Museum, in Cologne.

== History ==
From the early 1880s until the beginning of the First World War, Liebermann traveled regularly to the Netherlands, for study and recreation, appreciating the country's beauty, their people, social institutions and also their "great picturesque past". While studying in Paris, Liebermann was particularly influenced by the painter Jean-François Millet, who impressed him with his realistic works. Liebermann lived in the Barbizon artists' colony for a while in 1874, but didn't meet Millet because of his dislike of Germans. In December 1878, Liebermann moved to Munich, which was then considered the artistic capital of Germany, and painted some of his best-known works there. In 1881, he met Dutch painter Jozef Israëls, in Amsterdam, who introduced him to other members of the 'Hague School'.

In 1882, he stayed in the Netherlands for several weeks, where he created the current painting at the inn of Jan and Lammechien Mensel in the village of Zweeloo, in the province of Drenthe. It is a typical image of working for him: a woman is crouched in front of the washtub in the foreground, while the other maids lay out the cloths, another carries a heavy wooden bucket to the laundry place and two others lay cloths in the Sun to bleach them. He painted the orchard from nature, adding the working women later in the studio. He first drew a small oil sketch and tested the image section and the coloring of the painting, on another sketch he tried the positioning of the figures with a so-called imprint process, in which he painted the outline of the washerwoman in the foreground with charcoal and repeatedly printed it on the paper.

An original version of the painting was exhibited in the Salon de Paris, to negative criticism. The critics stated that the washerwoman dominated the foreground in this version. In the following year, he reworked the painting, introducing another piece of laundry, another lawn and an additional tree, and shortened the lower edge of the canvas by around 20 centimetres. These changes meant that the focus was no longer on the maid in the foreground, but rather on the depth of the landscape, which is emphasized even more by the wider format.

== Description ==
The paintings landscape depicts a cottage garden with several apple trees, where some washerwomen are laying out sheets on the lawn to bleach in the sun. The center and the lower half of the painting are taken up by the sunlit green lawn, on which a number of white linen cloths have already been laid out in the lower area. In the foreground there is a wooden washtub with a sheet hanging from it, not yet laid out.

In the middle of the painting, two maids are laying out more sheets. They are wearing work clothes consisting of a wide brown skirt, a top and a headscarf. In the background there are two other people, one with a child in her arms, who are talking over a garden fence, as well as a girl playing. A cow can be seen between the apple trees. The upper half of the painting and thus the background is characterized by the dark green foliage and the trunks of other trees that reach to the horizon. On the viewer's right half of the canvas, behind two trees, there is a light brown farmhouse with a dark entrance door and several windows. In front of the house several chickens run free on the lawn. The painting is signed and dated at the lower right: 'M Liebermann 82'.

== Provenance ==
After completion, the painting was shown in its original version in 1882 in the Salon de Paris. Due to public criticism, it was reworked by Liebermann in 1883.

It was in the Eduard Arnhold collection until 1925, who passed it on to his heirs. The painting has been in the Wallraf-Richartz-Museum, in Cologne since 1954.
