= Christ Among the Doctors (painting) =

Christ Among the Doctors is the title of several paintings depicting the Finding in the Temple, an episode in the Gospel of Luke:

- Christ Among the Doctors (Dürer), a painting of 1506 by Albrecht Dürer
- Christ Among the Doctors (Luini), a painting of c. 1510–1530 by Bernardino Luini
- Christ Among the Doctors (Veronese), a painting of c. 1560 by Paolo Veronese

== See also ==
- Other paintings illustrating the same passage:
  - The Finding of the Saviour in the Temple, a painting of 1854–1860 by William Holman Hunt
  - The Twelve-Year-Old Jesus in the Temple, a painting of 1879 by Max Liebermann
