= Women Plucking Geese =

Painting by Max Liebermann

- Die Gänserupferinnen (German)
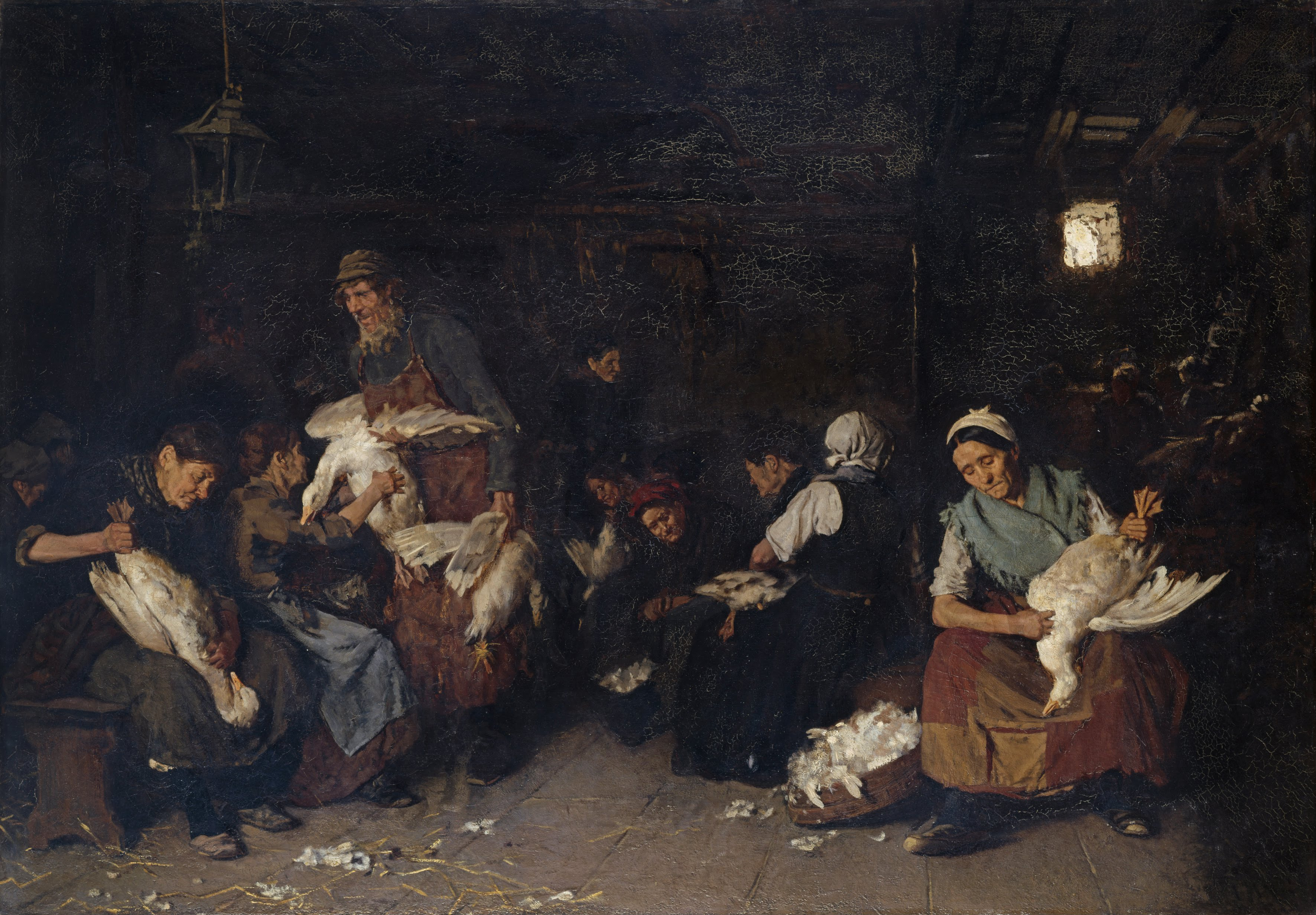
- Artist: Max Liebermann
- Year: 1872
- Medium: oil on canvas
- Movement: Realism
- Dimensions: 119.5 cm × 170.5 cm (47.0 in × 67.1 in)
- Location: Alte Nationalgalerie, Berlin

Women Plucking Geese is an oil-on-canvas painting executed in 1872 by German painter Max Liebermann. It is his first painting of large dimensions and measures 119.5 by 170.5 cm. It is held in the Alte Nationalgalerie, in Berlin.

== History and description ==
Liebermann's early style was realistic and was particularly influenced by 17th-century Dutch painting. Beginning in 1874, Liebermann regularly stayed in the Netherlands as a place of residence. Among the artists whose works he studied there were Frans Hals and Rembrandt. The influence of their technique of chiaroscuro can be noticed in the current painting. His depictions of rural motifs also show the influence of Mihály von Munkácsy. This painting in particular was inspired by one that he had seen at von Munkácsy's studio. The current canvas was created in Weimar, at the time when Liebermann was studying at the Grand Ducal Saxon Art School, since 1868.

The painting depicts a group of older women who are seated in a dark room, plucking geese. A man has arrived to bring them more animals. This presence is the only interaction between people in the painting, otherwise the looks of those involved appear rather serious and busy. A small, open window provides a point of light within the painting, and light also comes from the viewer's perspective. A lamp hanging from the ceiling is not lit.

== Reception ==
The painting and his other early works depicting rural motifs were initially not well received by the critics. It was only with his more impressionistic paintings that he started to have better reviews. Nevertheless, the German railway millionaire Bethel Henry Strousberg bought it for his art collection. It is now in the collection of the Alte Nationalgalerie, in Berlin.
