= Max Liebermann =

German painter (1847–1935)

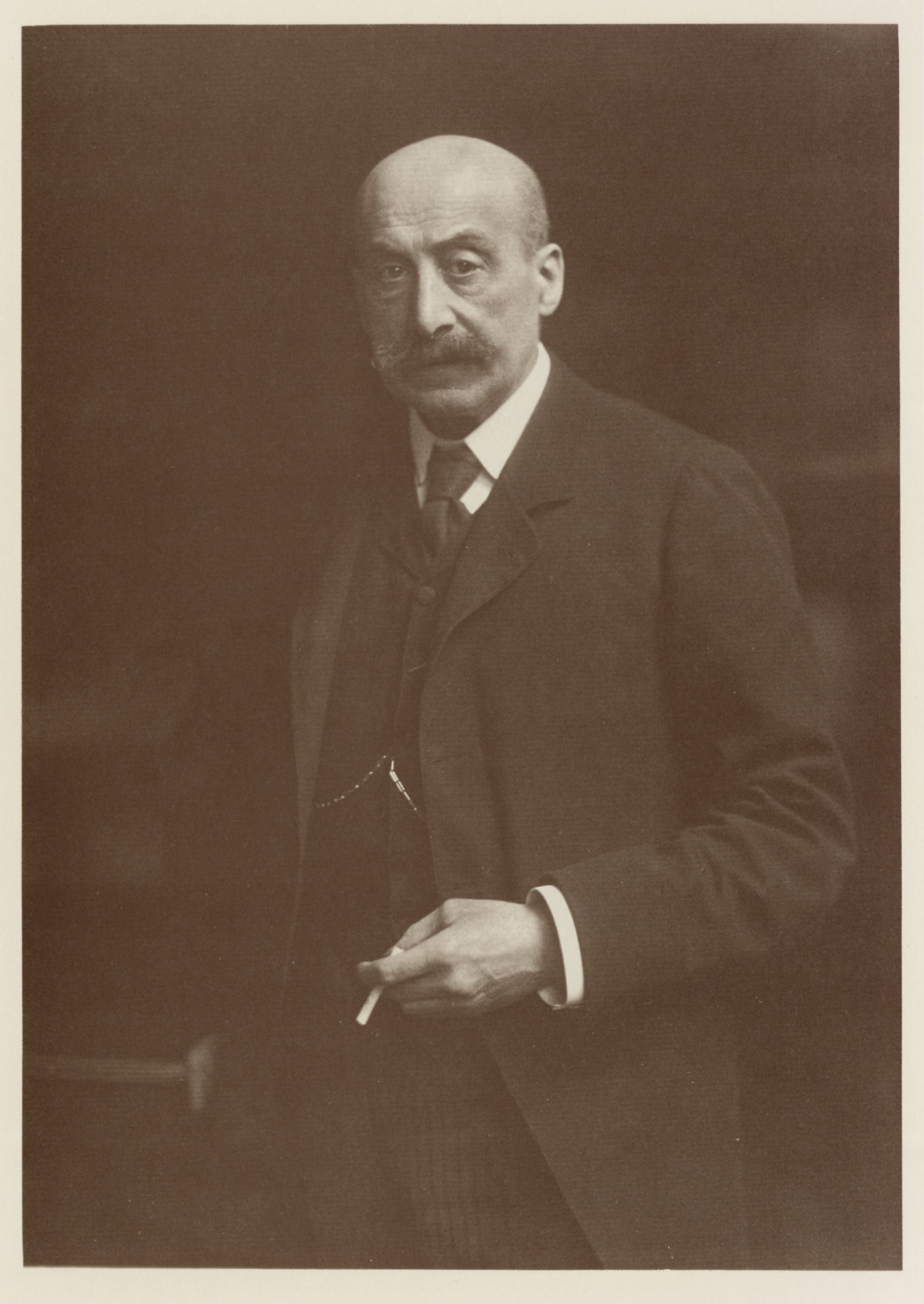
- Photograph by Jacob Hilsdorf (1904)
- Born: 20 July 1847; Berlin, Kingdom of Prussia
- Died: 8 February 1935 (aged 87); Berlin, Germany
- Education: University of Berlin, with additional studies in Weimar, Paris and the Netherlands
- Known for: Painting and print-making
- Style: Impressionism
- Movement: Berlin Secession
- Spouse: Martha Marckwald (m. 1884)

Signature
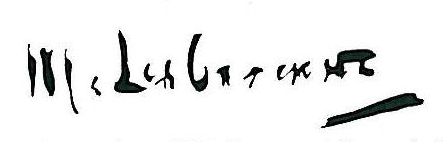

Max Liebermann (20 July 1847 – 8 February 1935) was a German painter and printmaker, and one of the leading proponents of Impressionism in Germany and continental Europe. In addition to his activity as an artist, he also assembled an important collection of French Impressionist works.

The son of a Jewish banker, Liebermann studied art in Weimar, Paris, and the Netherlands. After living and working for some time in Munich, he returned to Berlin in 1884, where he remained for the rest of his life. He later chose scenes of the bourgeoisie, as well as aspects of his garden near Lake Wannsee, as motifs for his paintings. Noted for his portraits, he did more than 200 commissioned ones over the years, including of Albert Einstein and Paul von Hindenburg.

Liebermann was honored on his 50th birthday with a solo exhibition at the Prussian Academy of Arts in Berlin, and the following year he was elected to the academy. From 1899 to 1911 he led the premier avant-garde formation in Germany, the Berlin Secession. Beginning in 1920 he was president of the Prussian Academy of Arts. On his 80th birthday, in 1927, Liebermann was celebrated with a large exhibition, declared an honorary citizen of Berlin and hailed in a cover story in Berlin's leading illustrated magazine. But such public accolades were short-lived. In 1933 he resigned when the academy decided to no longer exhibit works by Jewish artists, before he would have been forced to do so under laws restricting the rights of Jews. His art collection, which his wife inherited after his death, was looted by the Nazis after her death in 1943.

In his various capacities as a leader in the artistic community, Liebermann spoke out often for the separation of art and politics. In the words of arts reporter and critic, Grace Glueck, he "pushed for the right of artists to do their own thing, unconcerned with politics or ideology." His interest in French Realism was offputting to conservatives, for whom such openness suggested what they thought of as Jewish cosmopolitanism.

== Biography ==
=== Youth ===
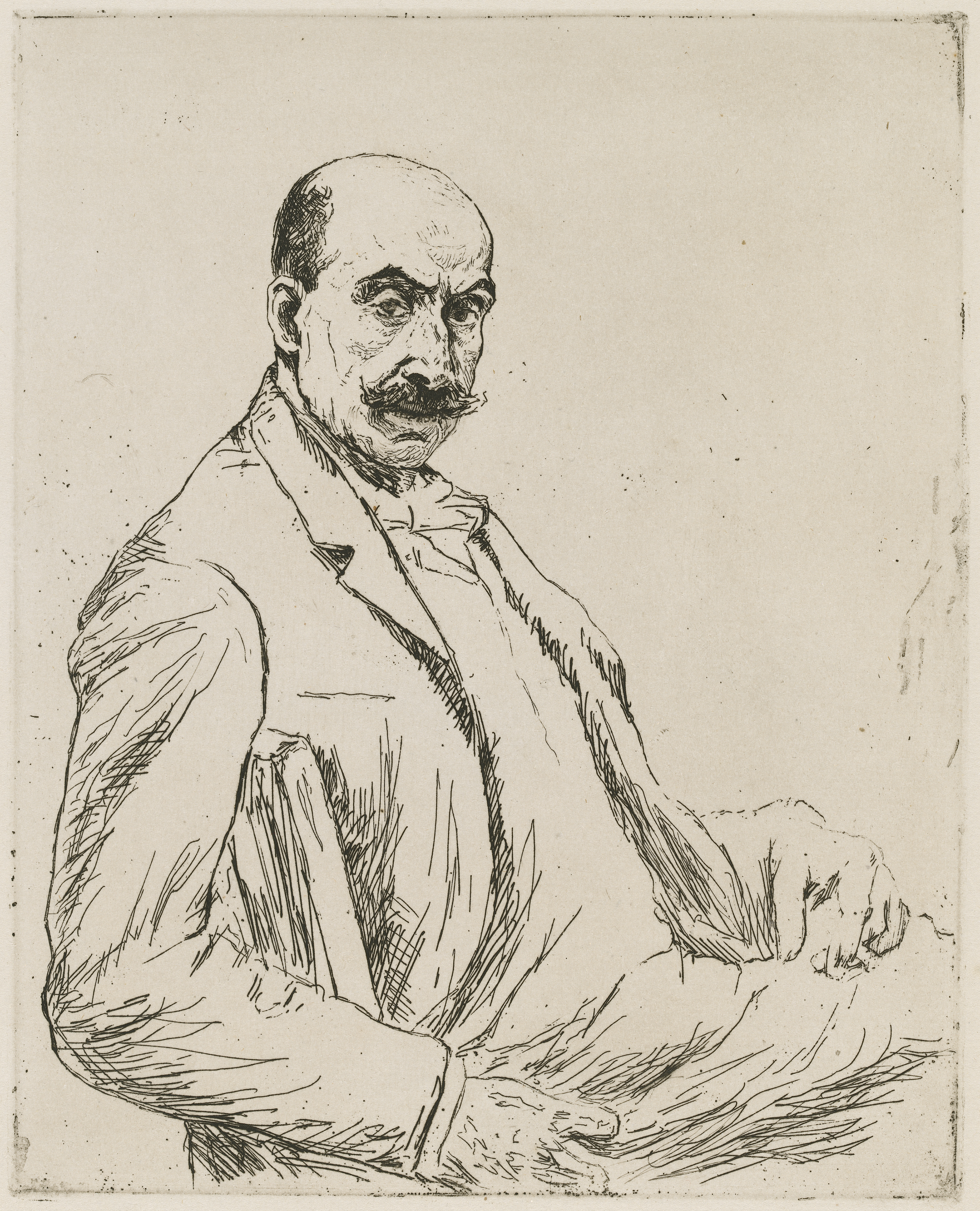
Self-Portrait, 1906, National Gallery of Art

Max Liebermann was a son of a wealthy Jewish fabric manufacturer turned banker, Louis Liebermann, and his wife Philippine (née Haller). His grandfather Josef Liebermann, a textile entrepreneur who founded Liebermann's significant fortune, was also the grandfather of Emil Rathenau, Carl Liebermann and Willy Liebermann von Wahlendorf. Only three days after Max's birth, the law on the conditions of the Jews of 23 July 1847 came into force, which granted the Jews in Prussia greater rights. He had five siblings, including the older brother Georg Liebermann, who later became an entrepreneur, and the younger brother, the historian Felix Liebermann.

In 1851 the Liebermanns moved to Behrenstraße, from where Max attended a nearby humanistic toddler school. Soon he hated this, as he did every later educational institution.

After primary school, Liebermann switched to the Dorotheenstädtische Realschule. He passed the time more and more by drawing, which his parents cautiously encouraged. When Max was ten years old, his father Louis bought the imposing Palais Liebermann, at Pariser Platz 7, directly to the north of the Brandenburg Gate. The family attended church services in the reform community and increasingly turned away from the more orthodox way of life of their grandfather. Although the Liebermanns' house had large salons and numerous bedrooms, the parents encouraged their three sons to sleep in a common room. This was also provided with a glass window in the wall so that the schoolwork could be supervised from outside.

When Louis Liebermann commissioned his wife to paint an oil painting in 1859, Max Liebermann accompanied his mother to the painter Antonie Volkmar. Out of boredom, he asked for a pen and began to draw. Even as an old woman, Antonie Volkmar was proud to have discovered Liebermann. His parents were not enthusiastic about painting, but at least in this case their son did not refuse to attend schools. On his afternoons off school, Max received private painting lessons from Eduard Holbein and Carl Steffeck.

In the family, Max was not considered particularly intelligent. At school, his mind often wandered, and he gave inappropriate answers to questions his teachers asked him. This resulted in teasing from classmates which became unbearable for him, so that he took refuge several times in supposed illnesses. His parents showed him affection and support, but he was aware of their greater regard for his older, more "sensible" brother Georg. Max's talent for drawing did not mean much to his parents: When his works were first published, the father forbade the 13-year-old from signing the name Liebermann on them.

As a secondary school, Louis Liebermann chose the Friedrichwerdersche Gymnasium for his sons, where the sons of Bismarck had studied. In 1862, 15-year-old Max attended an event by the young socialist Ferdinand Lassalle, whose passionate ideas fascinated the millionaire's son. In 1866 Max Liebermann graduated from high school. He later claimed to have been a bad student and had difficulty with getting through the exams: in truth, he was not one of the better students in mathematics, but his participation in the higher grades was considered "decent and well-mannered". In the Abitur exams he came fourth in his class, but in his family Max always felt like a "bad student".

=== Student life and early works ===
After graduating from high school, Liebermann enrolled at the Friedrich Wilhelm University. He chose chemistry, in which his cousin Carl Liebermann had also been successful. The chemistry course served as a pretext to be able to devote himself to art. Instead of attending the lectures, he rode out in the zoo and painted. At Carl Steffeck, he was also and allowed to perform assistant tasks more and more frequently in the design of monumental battle pictures. There he met Wilhelm Bode, who later became Liebermann's sponsor and director of the Kaiser Friedrich Museum. He studied law and philosophy at the University of Berlin, which exmatriculated Liebermann on 22 January 1868 because of "study failure". After an intense conflict with his father, who was not impressed by his son's path, In 1869 his parents made it possible for him to study painting and drawing at the Grand Ducal Saxon Art School in Weimar. There he became a student of the Belgian history painter Ferdinand Pauwels, who fostered in him an appreciation of the work of Rembrandt during a visit to the class at the Fridericianum in Kassel. Rembrandt had a lasting influence on the style of the young Liebermann.

In the Franco-Prussian War of 1870–71 he was briefly gripped by the general patriotic frenzy. He volunteered for the Johannitern because a badly healed broken arm prevented him from regular military service, and served as a medic during the siege of Metz. In 1870/1871 a total of 12,000 Jews went to war on the German side. The experiences on the battlefields shocked the young artist, whose enthusiasm for war waned.

From Whitsun 1871, Liebermann stayed in Düsseldorf, where the influence of French art was stronger than in Berlin. There he met Mihály von Munkácsy, whose realistic depiction of women plucking wool, a simple everyday scene, aroused Liebermann's interest. Financed by his brother Georg, he traveled to the Netherlands, Amsterdam and Scheveningen for the first time, where he was inspired by the light, the people and the landscape.

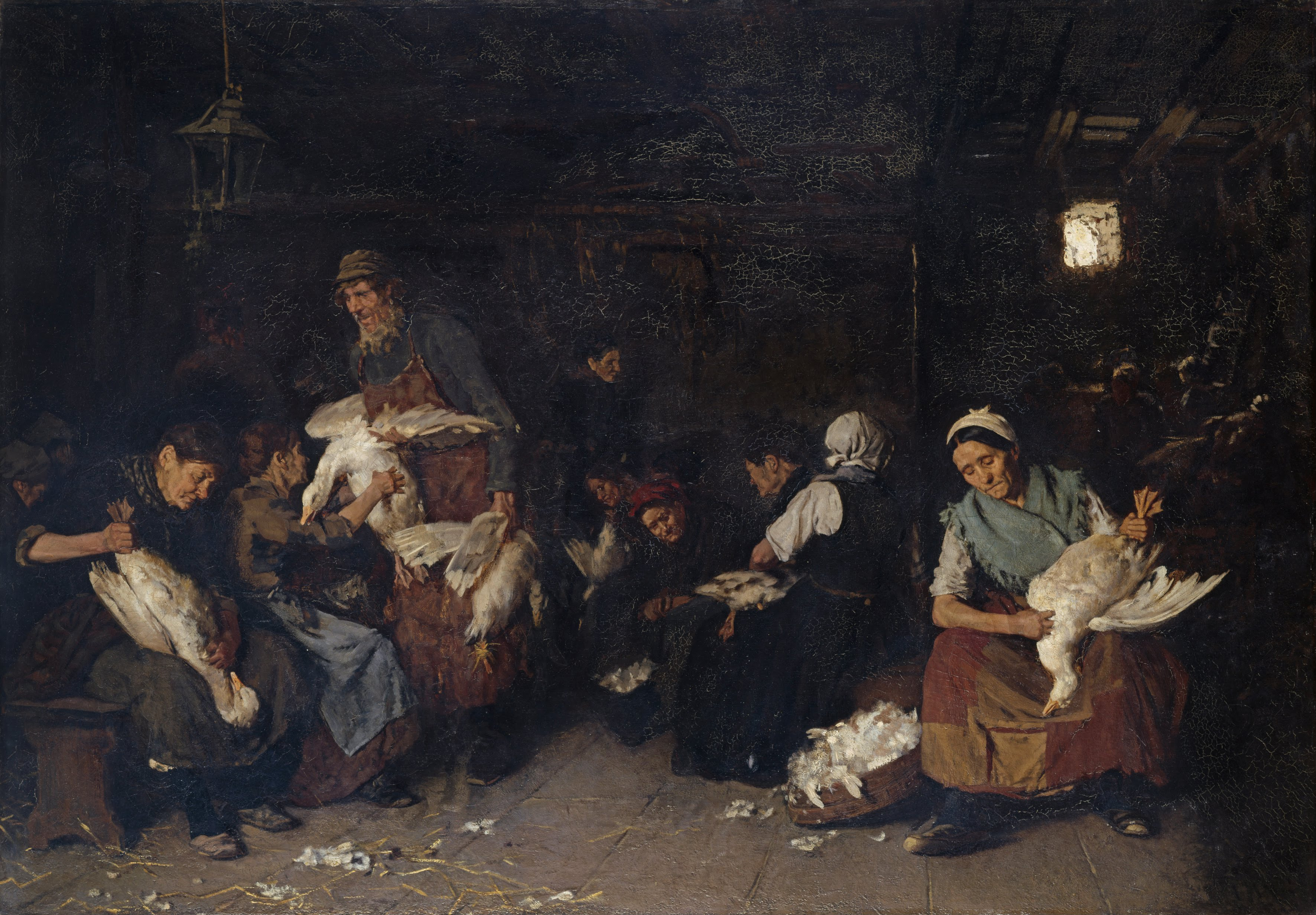
Women Plucking Geese (1872)

His first large painting, Die Gänserupferinnen (Goose Pluckers), was made in the months after his return. Painted in dark tones, it shows the prosaic activity of goose plucking. In addition to Munkászy's naturalism, Liebermann also incorporated elements of history painting into it. At the sight of the still unfinished painting his teacher Pauwels dismissed him: he could not teach him anything more. When Liebermann took part in the Hamburg art exhibition with the picture in 1872, his unusual subject aroused disgust and shock. Although the critics praised his skillful painting style, he was criticized as a "painter of the ugly". When the painting was exhibited in Berlin that same year, it met with similar opinions, but a buyer was found in the railway magnate Bethel Henry Strousberg. Liebermann had found his first style: realistic and unsentimental depiction of working people, without condescending pity or romanticism.

In 1873 Liebermann saw farmers harvesting beets at the gates of Weimar. He decided to capture this motif in oil, but when Karl Gussow cynically advised him not to paint the picture, Liebermann scratched it from the canvas. He felt powerless and without drive. Liebermann decided to visit the famous history and salon painter Hans Makart in Vienna, where he stayed for only two days. Instead, he was determined to turn his back on Germany and its art scene, which Liebermann regarded at the time as backward and outdated.

=== Paris, Barbizon and Amsterdam ===
In December 1873 Liebermann moved to Paris and set up a studio in Montmartre. In the world capital of art, he wanted to make contacts with leading realists and impressionists. But the French painters refused to have any contact with the German Liebermann. In 1874 he submitted his goose plucking to the Salon de Paris, where the picture was accepted but received negative reviews in the press, especially from a nationalist point of view. Liebermann first spent the summer of 1874 in Barbizon, near the Forest of Fontainebleau. "Munkácsy attracted me a lot, but Troyon, Daubigny, Corot and above all Millet did even more."

The landscape painting en plein air practiced by painters of the Barbizon School was of great importance for the development of Impressionism. Liebermann turned away from the old-fashioned, heavy painting of Munkácsy, more interested in the methods of the Barbizon School than in the motives that influenced them: In Barbizon, for example, he remembered the Weimar study Arbeiter im Rübenfeld, looked for a similar motif and created the Potato Harvest in Barbizon, which he did not complete until years later. Ultimately, he tried to follow in Millet's footsteps and, in the opinion of contemporary critics, lagged behind him with his own achievements: The depiction of the workers in their environment seemed unnatural; it seemed as if they were added to the landscape at a later date.

In 1875 Liebermann spent three months in Zandvoort in Holland. In Haarlem he developed a brighter and more spontaneous style by copying paintings by Frans Hals. It became Liebermann's habit to allow much time to pass between the idea and the execution of larger paintings. It was only when he returned to Paris in the autumn of 1875 and moved into a larger studio that he took up what he had seen and created his first painting of bathing fishermen's boys, a subject he would revisit years later.

In the summer of 1876 there was another stay of several months in the Netherlands, where he continued his studies. In Amsterdam he met the etcher William Unger, who brought him into contact with Jozef Israëls and the Hague School. In his picture, Dutch Sewing School, Liebermann already uses the effect of light in an impressionistic way. He got to know the Portuguese synagogue in Amsterdam through Professor August Allebé, which led him to a painterly analysis of his Jewish origins. The first studies of the Amsterdam orphanage were also made.

Under the pressure of being accountable to his parents and himself, Liebermann fell into deep depression in Paris, and was often close to despair. During this time only a few pictures were made, and his participation in the Paris Salon did not bring him the desired success. The art scene in the metropolis could not give Liebermann anything; it had even rejected him as an artist on chauvinistic reasons. His paintings had not become "French". In contrast, his regular stays in Holland were more influential. Liebermann made the final decision to leave Paris.

=== Munich ===
In 1878 Liebermann went on a trip to Italy for the first time. In Venice he wanted to look at works by Vittore Carpaccio and Gentile Bellini in order to find new orientation. There he met a group of Munich painters – among them Franz von Lenbach – with whom he stayed in Venice for three months and finally followed them to the Bavarian capital, which with the Munich School was also the German center of naturalistic art.

In December 1878 Liebermann began work on The 12-Year-Old Jesus in the Temple With the Scholars. He had already made the first sketches for this work in the synagogues of Amsterdam and Venice. Never before had he staged a picture with such care: he combined the studies of the synagogue interiors with individual figures, of which he previously made nude studies, in order to then bring them together dressed. He immersed the subject in an almost mystical light, which seems to emanate from the baby Jesus as the shining center.

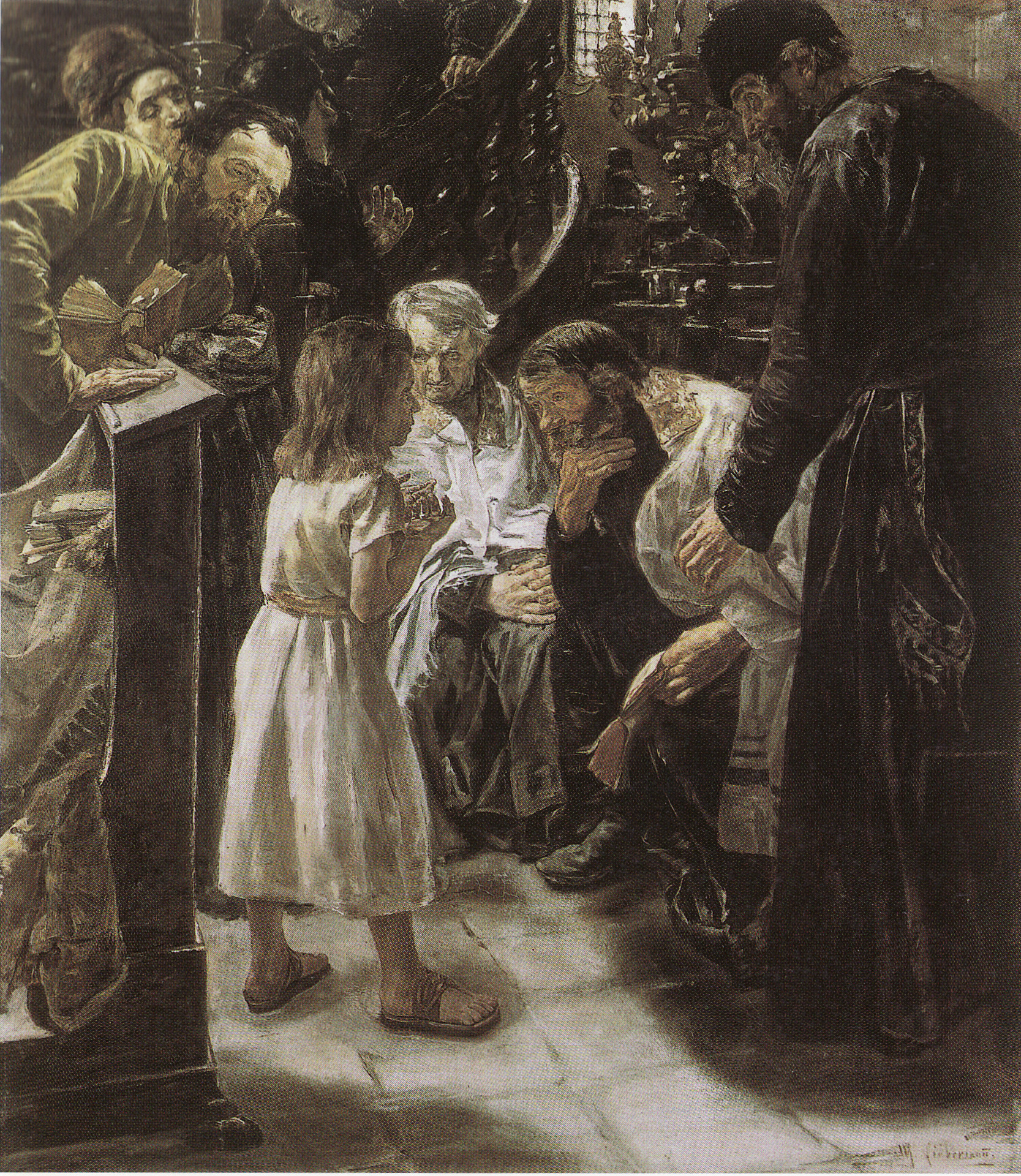
The Twelve-Year-Old Jesus in the Temple, 1879

His painting of a Semitic-looking boy Jesus conferring with Jewish scholars sparked a wave of indignation. At the International Art Show in Munich it was denounced for its supposed blasphemy, with a critic in the Augsburger Allgemeine describing Jesus as "the ugliest, most impertinent Jewish boy imaginable." While the later Prince Regent Luitpold sided with Liebermann, the conservative MP and priest Balthasar von Daller denied him as a Jew the right to represent Jesus in this way. The painting was "removed from its central position of honor on the opening day of the Munich Exhibition on the orders of Prince Luitpold of Bavaria. In Berlin, the court preacher Adolf Stoecker continued the antisemitic debate about the painting. A few important artist colleagues took his side, including Wilhelm Leibl. In response to the criticism, Liebermann painted over the picture by redesigning the young Jesus. A photograph of the original shows a child clad in a shorter cloak and with sidelocks and head slightly pushed forward and without sandals; the overpainted picture shows Jesus in an upright posture with longer hair and a longer robe and sandals. Although the original version had been reproduced in Richard Muther's overview publication for decades the overpainting was not discovered until 1993. The discovery of the overpainting initiated an intensive discussion about the reasons for Liebermann's choice of a historical subject (coined since centuries by the Christian iconography) in view of the growing antisemitism, as well as Liebermann's own relationship to Judaism.

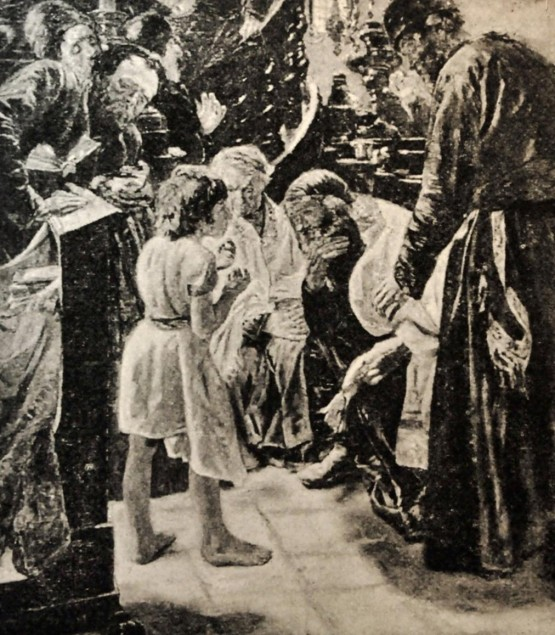
The Twelve-Year-Old Jesus in the Temple, 1879, original version, as reproduced in Muther's publication

From that time on, Liebermann was a famous artist, but his painterly advances came to a standstill during his stay in Holland in 1879: The light in a view of a rural village street that was created at that time appears pale and unnatural. In 1880 he took part in the Paris Salon. The pictures that were shown there had one thing in common: the representation of people working peacefully side by side in a harmonious community. Liebermann did not find the mood shown in the surroundings of Munich, which was heated up by antisemitic hostility, but tried to absorb it in his annual stays in the Netherlands. In 1879 he also traveled to the Dachauer Moos, Rosenheim and the Inn Valley for painting stays, where his painting Brannenburger Biergarten was created.

=== Netherlands ===
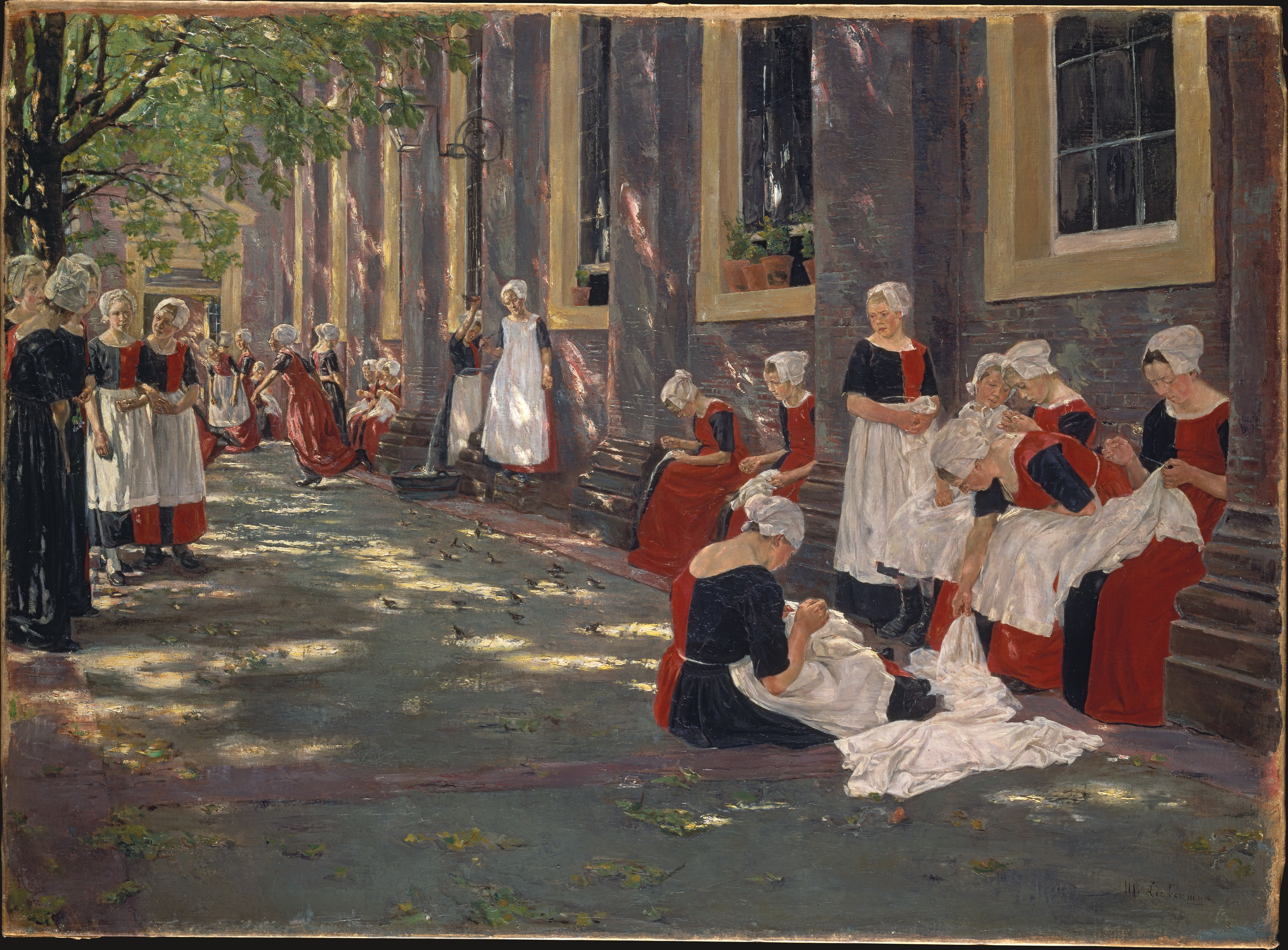
Recreation Time in the Amsterdam Orphanage, 1881–82

In the summer of 1880, Liebermann traveled to the Brabant village of Dongen. There studies emerged that he later used for his painting Schusterwerkstatt. After completing this work, he traveled once more to Amsterdam before returning to Munich. Something happened there that "decided his artistic career". He glanced into the garden of the Catholic old man's house, where elderly men in black were sitting on benches in the sunlight. About this moment, Liebermann later said: "It was as if someone were walking on a level path and suddenly stepped on a spiral spring that sprang up". He began to paint the motif, and for the first time used the effect of the light filtered through a canopy (or other barriers), the later so-called "Liebermann's sunspots", that is, the selective representation of (partially) self-colored light to create an atmospheric atmosphere. This prefigured Liebermann's late Impressionist work, which has been compared to the work of Renoir.

At the Paris Salon in 1880 "he was the first German to receive an honorable mention for this work". In addition, Léon Maître, an important Impressionist collector, acquired several paintings by Liebermann. Encouraged by the longed-for success, he turned to an earlier topic: Using older studies, he composed Recreation Time in the Amsterdam Orphanage (1881–82), also with "sunspots".

In the fall, Liebermann traveled again to Dongen to complete the Shoemaker's Workshop there. In this work, too, his clear turn to light painting is manifested, but at the same time he remained true to his earlier work depictions by continuing to dispense with transfigurative, romantic elements. The Shoemaker's Workshop and Recreation Time in the Amsterdam Orphanage found a buyer in Jean-Baptiste Faure in the Paris Salon of 1882. The French press celebrated him as an impressionist. The collector Ernest Hoschedé wrote enthusiastically to Édouard Manet: "If it is you, my dear Manet, who revealed the secrets of the open air to us, Liebermann knows how to listen to the light in an enclosed space."

Instead of allowing himself to be absorbed by Impressionism, Liebermann stepped back from the sphere of popular light painting and turned back to the naturalism of Leibl in his Bleaching on the Lawn (1882–83). While he was working on this painting, Vincent van Gogh tried to meet Liebermann in Zweeloo, but he did not succeed. Back from the Netherlands, he followed Countess von Maltzan's call to Militsch in Silesia, where he made his first commissioned work – a view of the village.

=== Return to Berlin ===
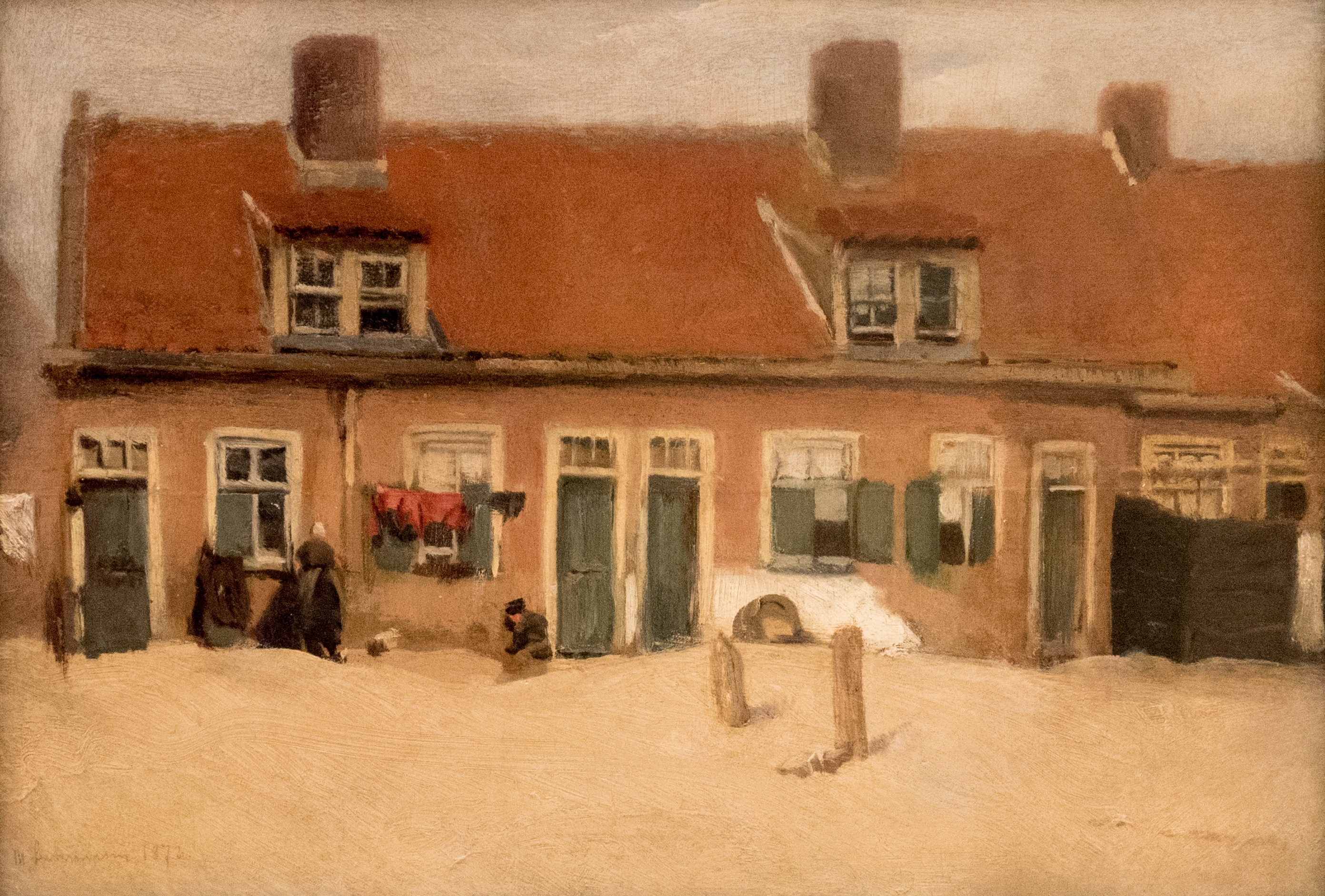
Old Houses in Scheveningen, 1897

In 1884 Liebermann decided to return to his hometown Berlin, although he was aware that this would lead to inevitable conflicts. In his opinion, sooner or later Berlin would take on the role of the capital from an artistic point of view, as the largest art market was located there and he increasingly saw Munich's traditions as a burden.

In May 1884 he was engaged to Martha Marckwald (1857–1943), who was the sister of his sister-in-law. The wedding ceremony took place on 14 September after the move from Munich to Berlin had been completed. The couple lived together for the first time, In den Zelten 11, on the northern edge of the zoo. However, the honeymoon did not lead to Italy, as was customary at the time, but via Braunschweig and Wiesbaden to Scheveningen in Holland. There Jozef Israëls joined the two; together they traveled to Laren, where Liebermann met the painter Anton Mauve. Further stops on the trip were Delden, Haarlem and Amsterdam. Liebermann produced studies everywhere and collected ideas that largely filled him up in the years that followed.

After his return he was accepted into the Association of Berlin Artists. Anton von Werner, his later adversary, also voted for his admission. In August 1885 Liebermann's only daughter was born, who was given the name "Marianne Henriette Käthe", but was only called Käthe. He painted little during this time, as he devoted himself entirely to the role of father.

Carl and Felicie Bernstein lived across from the Liebermann family. At his exceptionally cultivated neighbors, Liebermann saw paintings by Édouard Manet and Edgar Degas, which accompanied him throughout his subsequent life. In addition, he was able to feel for the first time in their circle as an accepted member of the Berlin artist community: Max Klinger, Adolph Menzel, Georg Brandes and Wilhelm Bode came and went there as well as Theodor Mommsen, Ernst Curtius and Alfred Lichtwark. The latter, the director of the Hamburger Kunsthalle, recognized Liebermann's Impressionist potential early on. His entry into the Society of Friends also made it easier to achieve social acceptance in the bourgeois upper class.

After eight years of absence from Berlin, Liebermann took part in the exhibition of the Academy of the Arts again for the first time in 1886. For the exhibition he selected the paintings Freetime in the Amsterdam Orphanage, Altmannhaus in Amsterdam and The Grace, which depicts a Dutch peasant family praying in a gloomy, atmospheric setting and which was painted at the suggestion of Jozef Israël. The "opinion maker" Ludwig Pietsch described Liebermann as a great talent and an outstanding representative of modernism.

In the summer of 1886, Martha Liebermann went to Bad Homburg vor der Höhe for a cure with her daughter, which gave her husband the opportunity to study in Holland. He returned to Laren, where flax was made from raw linen in peasant cottages. Impressed by the subject of the collaborative work, Liebermann began to draw sketches and paint a first version in oil. In his Berlin studio he composed the studies for a painting in larger format, on which he was able to complete work in the spring of 1887. The representation of collective work should show the "heroically patient" in everyday life.

In May 1887 the picture was exhibited at the Paris Salon, where it was received with only muted applause. At the international anniversary exhibition in Munich, a critic described the painting as "the real representation of dull infirmity caused by a monotony of hard work. […] Peasant women in worn aprons and wooden slippers, with faces that hardly show that they were young, the features of grim old age, lie in the chamber, the beams of which are oppressively weighed down, their mechanical daily work." Adolph Menzel, on the other hand praised the picture and described the painter as "the only one who makes people and not models".

At this time, the art critic Emil Heilbut published a "study on naturalism and Max Liebermann", in which he described the painter as "the bravest forerunner of the new art in Germany". Kaiser Wilhelm I died in March 1888, followed by Friedrich III on the throne. With his reign there were hopes that Prussia would transform into a parliamentary monarchy, which ended only 99 days later with his death. Max Liebermann stayed in Bad Kösen in the spring of the three emperor year. From the death of Friedrich III. dismayed, he painted a fictional memorial service for Emperor Friedrich III. in Bad Kösen, which shows that, despite his left-wing political views, he developed profound sympathy to the Hohenzollern monarchy. He wanted to be a free spirit, but he was unable to reject the Prussian traditions because of his character.

In 1889 the world exhibition took place in Paris on the occasion of the centenary of the French Revolution. The monarchies of Russia, Great Britain and Austria-Hungary refused to participate because they rejected the celebration of the revolution. When the Germans Gotthardt Kuehl, Karl Koepping and Max Liebermann were appointed to the jury, this caused political explosive in Berlin. Liebermann inquired of the Prussian minister of education Gustav von Goßler, who let him do it – tantamount to unofficial support. At the same time, the newspaper La France stoked a campaign in Paris against the general participation of Prussia.

Liebermann came up with the plan to present the first guard of German painting with Menzel, Leibl, Wilhelm Trübner and Fritz von Uhde. The German press reproached him for serving up the idea of revolution. The old Adolph Menzel again took Liebermann's side, and the first presentation of non-official German art on French soil took place. The world exhibition finally brought Liebermann into the limelight. In Paris he was honored with a medal of honor and admission to the Société des Beaux-Arts. He only refused the accolade of the Legion of Honor out of consideration for the Prussian government.

In 1889 Liebermann traveled to Katwijk, where he took leave of the social milieu as a subject with the painting Woman with Goats. After he was able to celebrate increasing success, he found the leisure to turn to images of easier life. In 1890 Liebermann received several commissions from Hamburg, all of which could be traced back to Alfred Lichtwark: In addition to a pastel in the Kirchenallee in St. Georg, he got his first portrait commission from there. After completing the painting based on Hals's painting, the sitter, Mayor Carl Friedrich Petersen, was outraged. He found the naturalness of the representation in connection with the apparently casual official dignity bestowed by historicizing clothing repugnant. In Lichtwark's eyes, the mayor's portrait remained "a failure". Liebermann had more success with his work Woman with Goats, for which he received the Great Gold Medal in the spring of 1891 at the exhibition of the Munich Art Association.

=== The secession crisis ===
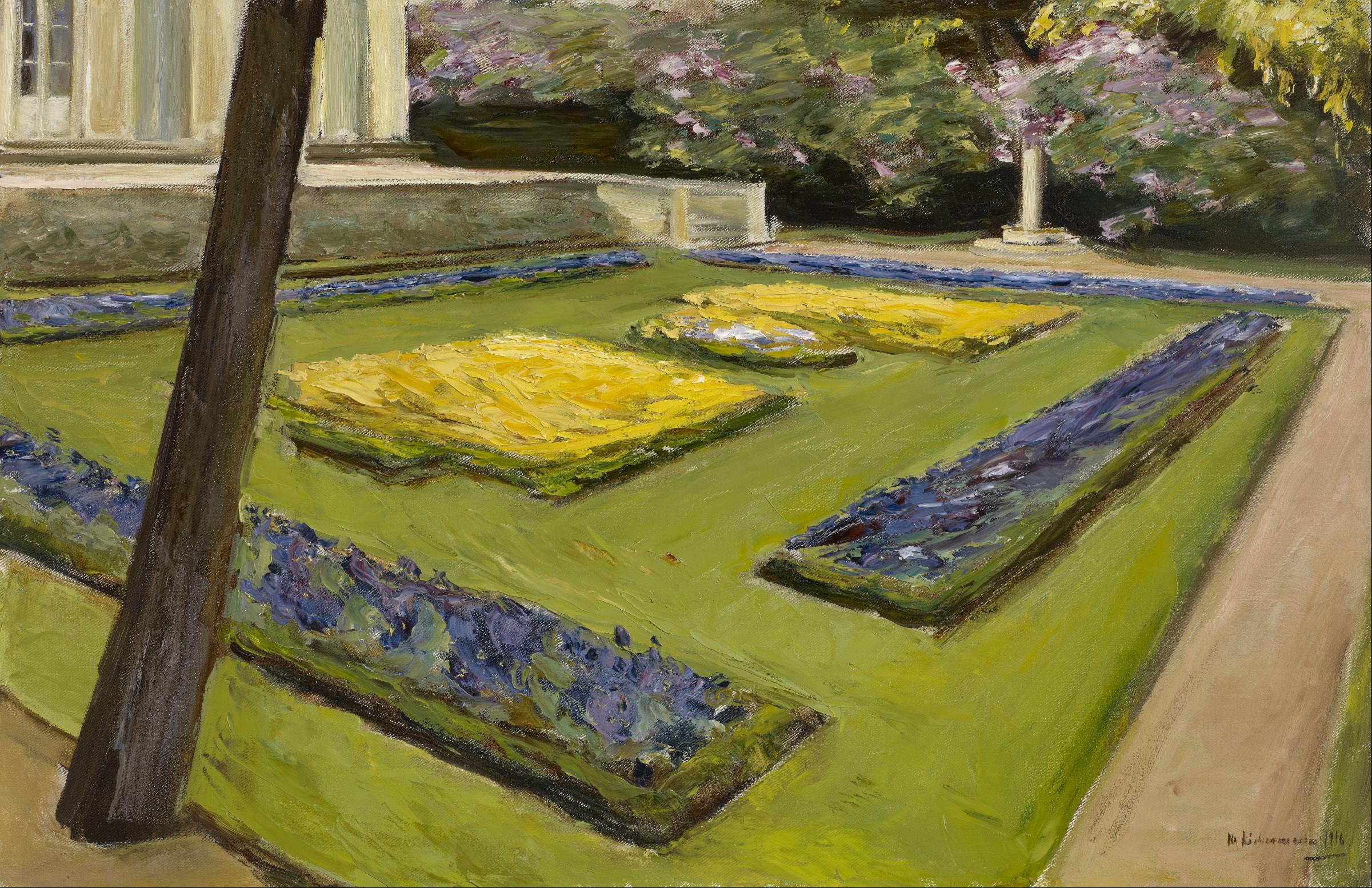
Terrace in the Garden near the Wannsee towards Northwest, 1916

Liebermann was the president of the Berlin Secession from its beginning in 1898. The Secession was a group of progressive artists who formed an independent exhibition society to promote modern art. Liebermann recruited prominent German Impressionists such as Lovis Corinth, Ernst Oppler and Max Slevogt for the Berlin Secession. In 1908 Walter Leistikow died, who as one of the founders had been an important pillar of the Secession. Liebermann's health deteriorated from the spring of 1909, and while he went to Karlsbad for a cure, a generational conflict broke out between Impressionists and Expressionists. In 1910, the Secession board under Liebermann rejected 27 Expressionist images, and the former rebel now seemed a conservative spokesman. At the same time he initiated the disintegration of the Secession movement. Emil Nolde, representing the counterpart in this conflict, accused Liebermann of a fundamental hostility towards progress and of dictatorial power within the secession. Nonetheless, the Secession in 1910 exhibited works by Pablo Picasso, Henri Matisse, Georges Braque and the Fauves for the first time. The Secession Committee stood behind its president and called Nolde's approach a "blatant hypocrisy". A general assembly was called, which voted 40 to 2 for the exclusion of Nolde. Liebermann himself had voted against the exclusion and stated in a defense speech: "I am absolutely against the exclusion of the writer, even at the risk that similar motives [...] could lead to [...] such so-called 'younger opposition'".

Through his own efforts to save Nolde's honor, Liebermann had wanted to make his tolerance clear, but the split in the Secession movement could not be stopped. On the initiative of the Berlin painter Georg Tappert, followed by Max Pechstein and other artists, including Nolde, the New Secession was formed. On 15 May, it mounted its first exhibition under the title "Rejected by the Secession Berlin 1910". Painters from Die Brücke and the Neue Künstlervereinigung München joined the New Secession. In the spring of 1911 Liebermann fled to Rome before the Secession crisis in Berlin. The death of his friend Jozef Israëls also fell at this time. The criticism of his leadership style grew louder until it finally came from within his own ranks: On 16 November 1911, Liebermann himself resigned as President of the Berlin Secession. Max Beckmann, Max Slevogt and August Gaul also took their leave. The general assembly elected Liebermann as its honorary president and entrusted Lovis Corinth with the leadership of the Secession. This decision anticipated the end of the Secession and sealed the decline of German Impressionism.

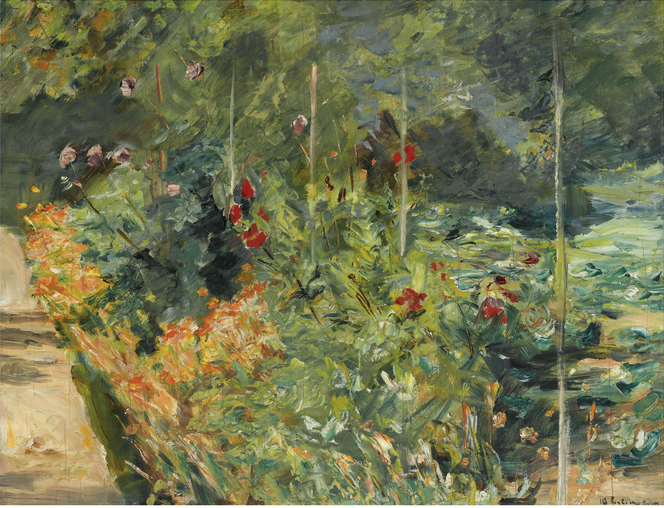
The Wannsee Garden to the West, ca. 1920

In 1909, Liebermann bought property in Wannsee, a wealthy suburb of summer homes on the outskirts of Berlin. There he had a country house built for himself by the architect Paul Otto August Baumgarten based on the examples of Hamburg patrician villas. The Liebermann Villa, which he moved into for the first time in the summer of 1910, is what he called his "Schloss am See". Liebermann felt comfortable there and particularly enjoyed his personal design. He particularly enjoyed the large garden, which he and Alfred Lichtwark designed. From the 1910s until his death, images of the gardens dominated his work.

The first post-Liebermann's annual Secession exhibition in 1912, under the chairmanship of Corinth, was unsuccessful. Liebermann again spent the summer of the year in Noordwijk. During a stay in The Hague, Queen Wilhelmina awarded him the House Order of Orange. The Friedrich-Wilhelms-Universität Berlin made him an honorary doctorate, and the long-awaited appointment to the Senate of the Academy of Arts followed. The art academies in Vienna, Brussels, Milan and Stockholm made him their member. Citizens of Berlin who had rank and name had Liebermann portray them. At the beginning of 1913 Corinth resigned as chairman of the Secession with the entire board, Paul Cassirer was elected chairman. The honorary president tried to prevent this appointment of a non-artist, but did not want to "step into the breach again". Cassirer excluded from the 1913 annual exhibition exactly those members who had voted against him in the general assembly. Unexpectedly, Lovis Corinth sided with them. Liebermann and other founding members of the Secession left the association in this second crisis. In February 1914, the "Free Secession" was finally founded, which continued the tradition of the first Secession movement. There was a hostility between Liebermann and Corinth that was symbolic for the Rumpfsecession and the Free Secession. Corinth tried to take action against Liebermann until his death, and in his autobiography he also drew a deeply disgusted picture of his colleague, who kept withdrawing from the limelight and devoted himself to his garden at Wannsee.

=== World War I ===
Three weeks after the outbreak of the First World War, the 67-year-old Liebermann wrote: "I continue to work as calmly as possible, in the opinion that I thereby serve the general best." Despite such statements, he was gripped by general patriotism. He devoted himself to artistic war propaganda and drew for the newspaper Kriegzeit – Künstlerflugblätter, which was published weekly by Paul Cassirer. The first edition showed a lithograph by Liebermann of the masses gathered at the beginning of the war in front of the Berlin City Palace on the occasion of Wilhelm II's "party speech". Liebermann understood the Emperor's words as a call to serve the national cause and at the same time to lower social barriers. During this time, his double outsider role as a Jew and an artist could (at least apparently) be eliminated. Due to the emperor's prosemitic appeal "To my dear Jews", he also felt obliged to civilly participate in the war. The former pioneer of the Secession movement now stood completely on the soil of the empire. He identified with the castle peace policy of the Reich Chancellor Theobald von Bethmann Hollweg, who tried to bridge internal contradictions in German society. Bethmann Hollweg was portrayed by Liebermann in a lithograph in 1917.

In autumn 1914, Liebermann was one of the 93 signatories, mostly professors, writers and artists, of the appeal "To the cultural world!", in which German war crimes were rejected with a six-fold "It's not true!". After the war, he expressed himself self-critically about this appeal: "At the beginning of the war you didn't think twice about it. People were united in solidarity with their country. I know well that the socialists have a different view. […] I've never been a socialist, and you don't become one anymore at my age. I received my entire upbringing here, and I spent my entire life in this house, which my parents already lived in. And the German fatherland also lives in my heart as an inviolable and immortal concept."

He joined the German Society in 1914, in which public figures came together for political and private exchange under the chairmanship of the liberal-conservative politician Wilhelm Solf. The only condition was advocacy of the castle peace policy of Chancellor Bethmann Hollweg. The further the war progressed, the greater was Liebermann's retreat into private life, to his country house on the Wannsee. But portrait painting was initially limited to the military, like Karl von Bülow. Even before the outbreak of war, Liebermann had been the undisputed portrait painter of the Berlin upper class. In this way, an enormous oeuvre of portraits was created that cemented Liebermann's reputation as a painter of his era. For his great enthusiasm for the war, however, he later had to take strong criticism. The art writer Julius Meier-Graefe wrote about the lithographs during the war: "Today some people give up their cow and cabbage and suddenly discover new motifs during the war, others come up with the idea of handing their polo players a saber and imagine that this is how you create a winner."

Liebermann never left Berlin with the exception of two spa stays in Wiesbaden in 1915 and 1917. After 1913 he no longer spent the summers in the Netherlands, but at the Wannsee, while in the winter he lived at Pariser Platz. His family did not suffer hardship, even if they used the flower beds of his country house to grow vegetables because of the insecurity of supplies. In May 1915, Käthe Liebermann, the painter's now almost 30-year-old daughter, married the diplomat Kurt Riezler, who, as an advisor to Bethmann Hollweg, had close contacts in politics. In that year Anton von Werner died, as it were as a symbol of an ending era, as did Liebermann's cousin Emil Rathenau. The founding generation parted, and a new era was about to begin.

In April 1916 Liebermann's essay "The Fantasy in Painting" appeared for the first time in book form. In the rewritten introduction he wrote: "Were the aesthetic views more confused than they are today? – Where a younger art historian Wilhelm Worringer writes from the trenches of Flanders that war decides not only for the existence of Germany, but also for the victory of Expressionism." When Kriegzeit in 1916 changed its name to "Bildermann", Liebermann gave up his participation. Instead, he dealt with illustration for the first time: In 1916 and 1917, he produced works on Goethe's novella and The Man of Fifty Years, as well as Heinrich von Kleist's Small Writings. His illustrative style describes the atmosphere at turning points in dramaturgy and was not designed for narration, which is why he did not make a breakthrough in this area and soon stopped working on illustrations for ten years.

In 1917 the Prussian Academy of the Arts dedicated a large retrospective of his work to Liebermann for his 70th birthday. Almost 200 paintings were shown in the exhibition. Julius Elias, whose wife Julie Elias dedicated her famous cookbook to Liebermann, called the honors for the painter "a coronation". The director of the National Gallery, Ludwig Justi (Tschudis' successor), promised him his own cabinet. Wilhelm II agreed to the birthday exhibition and awarded Liebermann the Order of the Red Eagle, 3rd class. The honoree noted with satisfaction that His Majesty had buried the hatchet against modern art. Walther Rathenau published an essay on the exhibition in the Berliner Tageblatt: "In Liebermann, the new, metropolitan mechanized Prussia paints itself. It had to be a person of spirit and will, of struggle, of passion and reflection."

On 18 January 1918, the opening ceremony of the Max Liebermann Cabinet of the National Gallery took place. The inauguration speech was given by the Minister of Education, Friedrich Schmidt-Ott. A few weeks later, 500,000 workers struck in Berlin alone – the Reich was on the verge of upheaval. When the November Revolution finally broke out, Liebermann was staying at the house on Pariser Platz. Machine guns of the monarchists were installed in his own house, which is why the soldiers of the revolutionaries attacked the palace. After a bullet went through the wall on the first floor into the drawing room, the defenders surrendered. After this incident, Liebermann brought his valuable picture collection to safety and moved with his wife into their daughter's house for a few weeks. Liebermann took a negative view of the political changes: although he advocated the introduction of equal suffrage in Prussia and democratic-parliamentary reforms at the imperial level, for him "a whole world, albeit a rotten one", collapsed. He had already regretted Bethmann Hollweg's departure in 1917 and saw republicanization as a missed opportunity for a parliamentary monarchy. "We've been through bad times now. [...] Berlin is ragged, dirty, dark in the evening, [...] a dead city, plus soldiers selling matches or cigarettes on Friedrichstrasse or Unter den Linden, blind organ grinders in half-rotten uniforms, in one word: pitiful."

=== Weimar years ===
After the end of the war and the revolution, Liebermann took over the office of President of the Berlin Academy of the Arts in 1920. The secessions continued to exist in parallel until they fell apart almost silently. Liebermann tried to unite the various currents under the umbrella of the academy, including expressionism. In the opening speech of the academy exhibition, he said: "Anyone who has experienced the rejection of Impressionism in his youth will be careful not to condemn a movement that he does not or does not yet understand, especially as head of the academy that although conservative by nature, it would freeze if it behaved in a purely negative manner towards the youth." With this he had returned to the liberality of the time before the secession crisis and was now trying to steer the fate of the academy with tolerance.

In view of the need to rebuild the collapsed imperial institution, Liebermann succeeded in providing it with a democratic structure, a free educational system and, at the same time, greater public attention. Through his advocacy, Max Pechstein, Karl Hofer, Heinrich Zille, Otto Dix and Karl Schmidt-Rottluff were accepted into the academy.

During the Weimar Republic, Liebermann was in constant demand as a portrait painter. He also painted a large number of self-portraits, as had been his habit since 1902.

In 1922, Walther Rathenau was murdered by right-wing activists. Liebermann was deeply disturbed by the murder of his relative and companion. He made lithographs for Heinrich Heine's "Rabbi von Bacharach" in addition to numerous paintings of his garden and drawings in memory of fallen Jewish soldiers at the front. In 1923 Liebermann was accepted into the order Pour le Mérite. On 7 October 1924, his younger brother Felix Liebermann, who had also been a friend of his life, died. Only two days later he had to mourn the death of his relative Hugo Preuss, the father of the Weimar constitution. Liebermann withdrew more and more into himself and his garden, and often appeared surly.

Nevertheless, he continued to advocate artistic progressiveness and political art, even though his own works were regarded as "classics" or disapprovingly as old-fashioned. He supported Otto Dix's painting Trench, which emotionally depicted the horror of the world war and which was accused of being a "tendentious work"; for Liebermann it was "one of the most important works of the post-war period". At the same time, despite his basically tolerant views, he polemicized against Ludwig Justi, who brought Expressionists to the Nationalgalerie for an exhibition. In September 1926, Liebermann wrote in the Jüdisch-Liberalen Zeitung. In the Yom Kippur edition he publicly confessed to his faith, to which he increasingly found his way back in old age. He also supported the Jewish children's home "Ahawah" and the aid association of German Jews.

In 1927 Liebermann came back into the public eye: the media and the art world celebrated him and his work on the occasion of his 80th birthday. Among the well-wishers were the Berlin veteran Zille as well as international greats such as Albert Einstein, Heinrich and Thomas Mann as well as Hugo von Hofmannsthal. Never before has a German artist been honored by his hometown in such a way as Berlin did with the more than 100 paintings by Liebermann's birthday exhibition. His life's work now appeared classic, the formerly provocative style in 1927 looked like documents from a bygone era. This is why the old Liebermann countered critics who accused him of seclusion and conservatism in the exhibition catalog: "The curse of our time is the addiction to the new [...]: the true artist strives for nothing else than: to become who he is."

His work was part of the painting event in the art competition at the 1928 Summer Olympics.

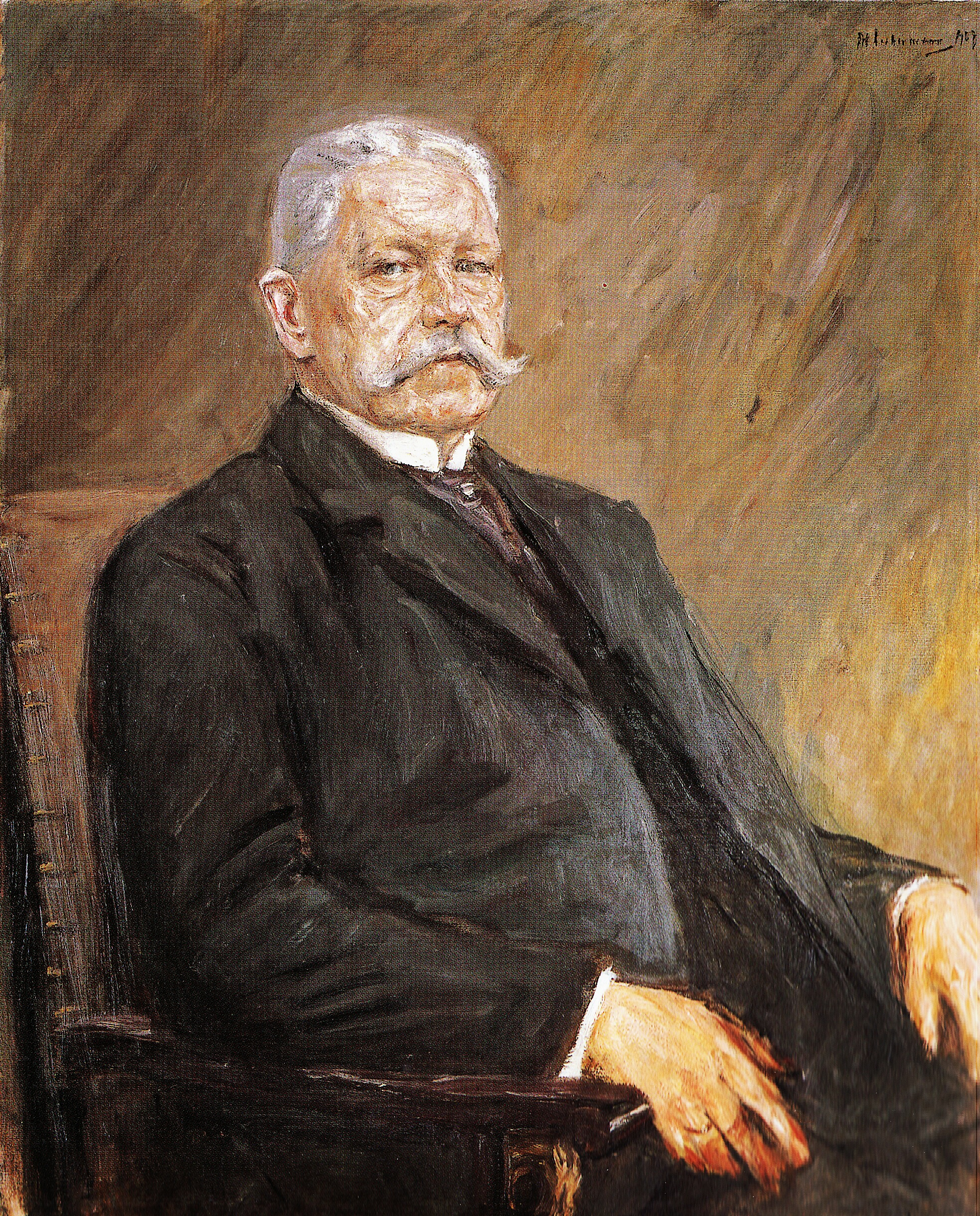
Portrait of President Paul von Hindenburg, 1927

The city of Berlin granted him honorary citizenship, which, however, was heatedly contested in the city council. On his birthday, Reich President Paul von Hindenburg honored Liebermann with the eagle shield of the German Reich "as a token of the thanks that the German people owe you". Interior Minister Walter von Keudell presented him with the Golden State Medal embossed with "For services to the state". At the end of 1927, Liebermann portrayed President Hindenburg. Although he did not confess to him politically, he gladly accepted the assignment and felt it was a further honor. The portrait sessions of their peers were characterized by mutual respect and a certain amount of sympathy. In Hindenburg, the "old master of German modernism" saw a veteran Prussian patriot who could not possibly derail into irrationality. Liebermann wrote: "The other day a Hitler paper wrote – it was sent to me – that it would be unheard of for a Jew to paint the Reich President. I can only laugh at something like that. I'm convinced that when Hindenburg finds out, he'll laugh about it too. I'm just a painter, and what does painting have to do with Judaism?" The writer Paul Eipper held his "studio talks" about his meeting with Liebermann on 25 March 1930 in his house on Pariser Platz in Berlin firmly: "We're talking about Hindenburg. He (Liebermann) is enthusiastic about him."

Liebermann was a popular subject for painters, photographers and caricaturists throughout his life. In addition to Lovis Corinth, he was also painted by the Swede Anders Zorn and the Dutchman Jan Veth, photographed by Yva and several times by Nicola Perscheid, and caricatured by Heinrich Zille, among others. The sculptor Fritz Klimsch made a bronze bust in 1912, which was exhibited in 1917 at the Great Berlin Art Exhibition in Düsseldorf.

Due to illness, Liebermann resigned his post as president of the academy in 1932, but was also elected honorary president. Through the treatment of his friend Ferdinand Sauerbruch (Sauerbruch made Liebermann's trapped hernia disappear in the Charité, on which occasion Liebermann had also portrayed the surgeon in the draft), Liebermann's neighbor at Wannsee since 1928, the painter recovered. The portraits that he made of Sauerbruch represent the conclusion of his portrait work and are also its climax. For the last time he turned to an individually new motif.

=== Nazi persecution ===
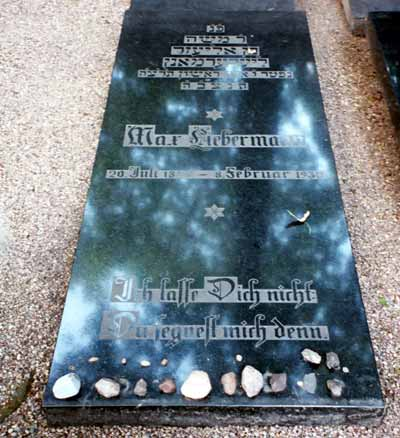
Liebermann's grave in Berlin. The German text, "Ich lasse dich nicht, Du segnest mich denn", is from Genesis 32:26.

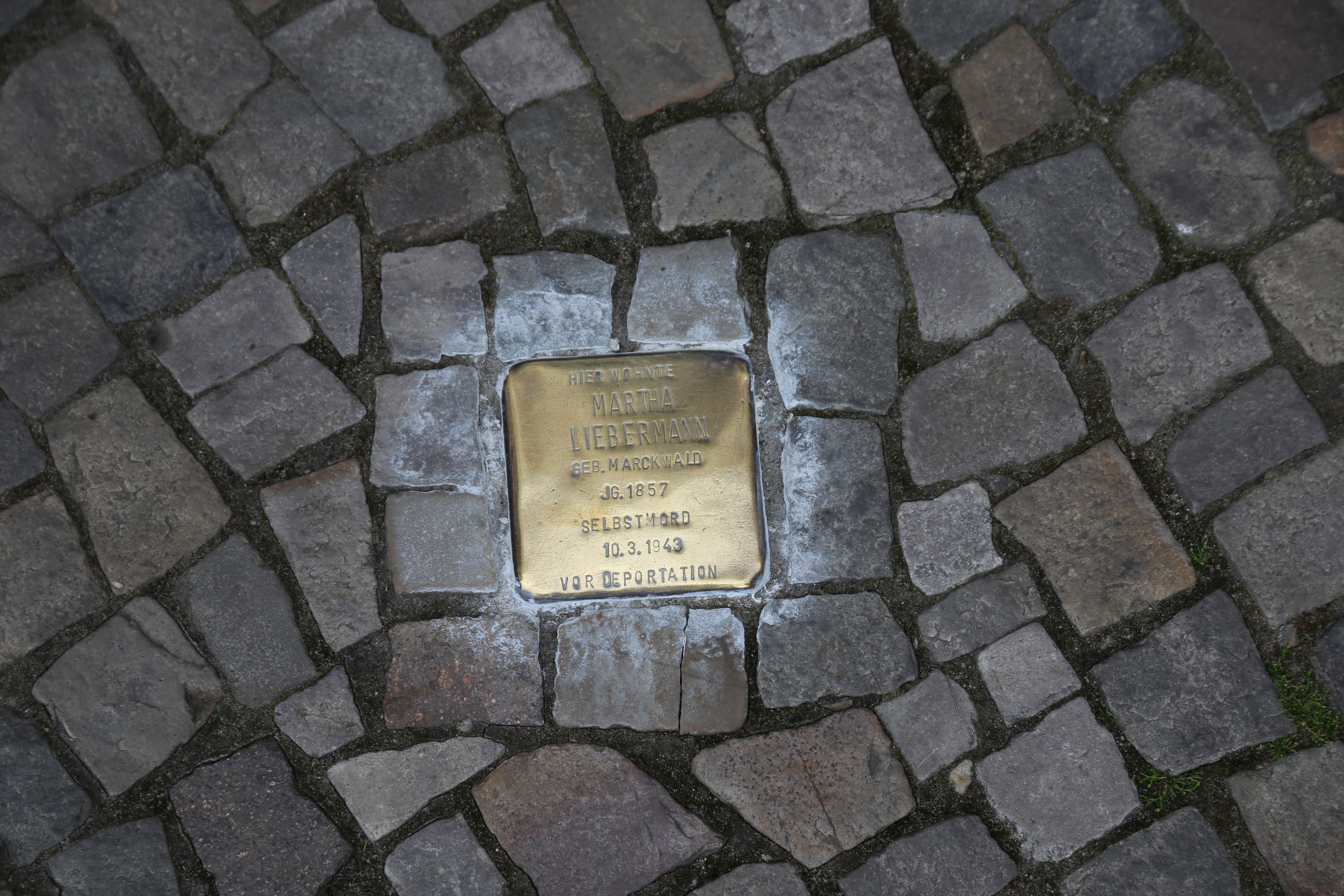
The stolperstein of Frau Liebermann, a concrete cube in place of a grave, commemorates her life while recognizing her as a victim of Nazi extermination or persecution.

30 January 1933 was the day when power was handed over to the National Socialists. While watching the Nazis celebrate their victory by marching through the Brandenburg Gate, Liebermann was reported to have commented: "Ich kann gar nicht soviel fressen, wie ich kotzen möchte." ("I could not possibly eat as much as I would like to throw up.").

Liebermann did not want to risk defending himself against the incipient change in cultural policy — as Käthe Kollwitz, Heinrich Mann or Erich Kästner did by signing the urgent appeal in June 1932. "The natural thing would be to escape. But for me, as a Jew, that would be viewed as cowardice."

Like other Jewish artists, Liebermann was persecuted as a Jew, and his works were removed from public collections.

On 7 May 1933 Liebermann resigned from his honorary presidency, senatorial posts and membership in the Prussian Academy of the Arts, explaining to the press: "During my long life I have tried, with all my might, to serve German art. In my opinion, art has nothing to do with politics or ancestry. I can no longer belong to the Prussian Academy of the Arts...since my point of view is no longer valued."

On the advice of the Swiss banker Adolf Jöhr, he was able to deposit the 14 most important works of his art collection from May 1933 at the Kunsthaus Zürich, where Wilhelm Wartmann was director.

He withdrew from the public eye, while hardly any of his companions stood by him and remained loyal. Only Käthe Kollwitz was still looking for access to him. One last self-portrait was created in 1934. Liebermann confessed to one of his last visitors: "I only live out of hate. [...] I no longer look out the window of this room – I don't want to see the new world around me."

=== Death ===
Liebermann died on 8 February 1935 in his house on Pariser Platz. Käthe Kollwitz reported that he fell asleep quietly at seven in the evening. The death mask was made by Arno Breker, who was Hitler's preferred sculptor during this time. The photographer Charlotte Rohrbach took the plaster mask.

His death was not covered in the media, which had already been brought into line, and was only mentioned in passing – if at all. The Academy of Arts, which in the meantime had become an instrument of the National Socialists, refused to honor the former president. For example, no official representative appeared at his funeral at the Schönhauser Allee Jewish cemetery on 11 February 1935 – neither from the academy nor from the city, of which he had been an honorary citizen since 1927. The Gestapo had even forbidden participation in the funeral in advance, fearing that it might turn into a demonstration for artistic freedom. Nevertheless, almost 100 friends and relatives came. Among the mourners were Käthe Kollwitz, Hans Purrmann and his wife Mathilde Vollmoeller-Purrmann, Konrad von Kardorff, Leo Klein von Diepold, Otto Nagel, Ferdinand Sauerbruch with his son Hans Sauerbruch, Bruno Cassirer, Georg Kolbe, Max J. Friedländer, Friedrich Sarre and Adolph Goldschmidt. According to Saul Friedländer, only three "Aryan" artists attended the funeral. In his funeral speech, Karl Scheffler pointed out that Liebermann was not just burying a great artist, but an epoch for which he was symbolic.

His daughter, Katharina Riezler, fled to the United States in 1938.

== Nazi-looted art ==
In addition to his own art, Liebermann was an important collector of art, notably of French Impressionists, for which he was the largest collector in Germany. Both Liebermann and many of his collectors were persecuted by the Nazis and their agents because they were Jewish. Artworks were stolen from his Jewish collectors and many have never been recovered. Liebermann's own extensive collection, which he bequeathed to his wife, Martha, after his death, was later looted from her apartment. Martha committed suicide in 1943 after she learned she was going to be deported to Theresienstadt concentration camp. About six months later, the Gestapo confiscated most of Liebermann's famous private art collection. The Palais Liebermann on Pariser Platz soon sank in ruins.

The German Lost Art Foundation lists hundreds of artworks that were either created by or owned by Max Liebermann in its official Lost Art database.

Claims for restitution for Nazi-looted art have been filed by both Max Liebermann's heirs and the heirs of his Jewish patrons whose collections were looted.

The Liebermann family has been trying to recover a portrait of Martha Liebermann that was on a Gestapo list of objects seized from her apartment for years.

When the art hoard of the son of Hitler's art dealer Hildebrand Gurlitt was discovered in Munich in 2013, one of the first artworks to be proven to have been looted by the Nazis was Liebermann's Two Riders on the Beach that had belonged to the Jewish collector David Friedmann.

Max Silberberg, the famous Jewish art collector from Breslau who was murdered in Auschwitz had several artworks by Liebermann that were looted by the Nazis. Some have been restituted.

== Commemoration ==
In 2005/2006, the Skirball Cultural Center in Los Angeles and the Jewish Museum in New York mounted the first major museum exhibition in the United States of Liebermann's work.

On 30 April 2006, the Max Liebermann Society opened a permanent museum in the Liebermann family's villa in the Wannsee district of Berlin. The artist's wife, Martha Liebermann, was forced to sell the villa in 1940. On 5 March 1943, at the age of 85 and bedridden from a stroke, she was notified to get ready for deportation to Theresienstadt concentration camp. Instead, she committed suicide in the family home, Haus Liebermann, hours before police arrived to take her away. There is a stolperstein for her in front of their former home by the Brandenburg Gate in Berlin.

In 2011, the Israel Museum returned a painting to the Max Liebermann estate, decades after the masterpiece was looted from a Jewish museum in Nazi Germany. Liebermann had loaned his painting to the Jewish Museum in Berlin in the 1930s. The work, along with many others, disappeared from the museum during World War II.

From 28 February–7 June 2026 the Museum Barberini exhibited Avant-Garde: Max Liebermann and Impressionism in Germany exploring his impact on German Impressionism. The catalog was edited by Michael Philipp, Nerina Santorius, Ortrud Westheider, and Daniel Zamani. (ISBN 978-3-791-37625-7)

== Gallery ==
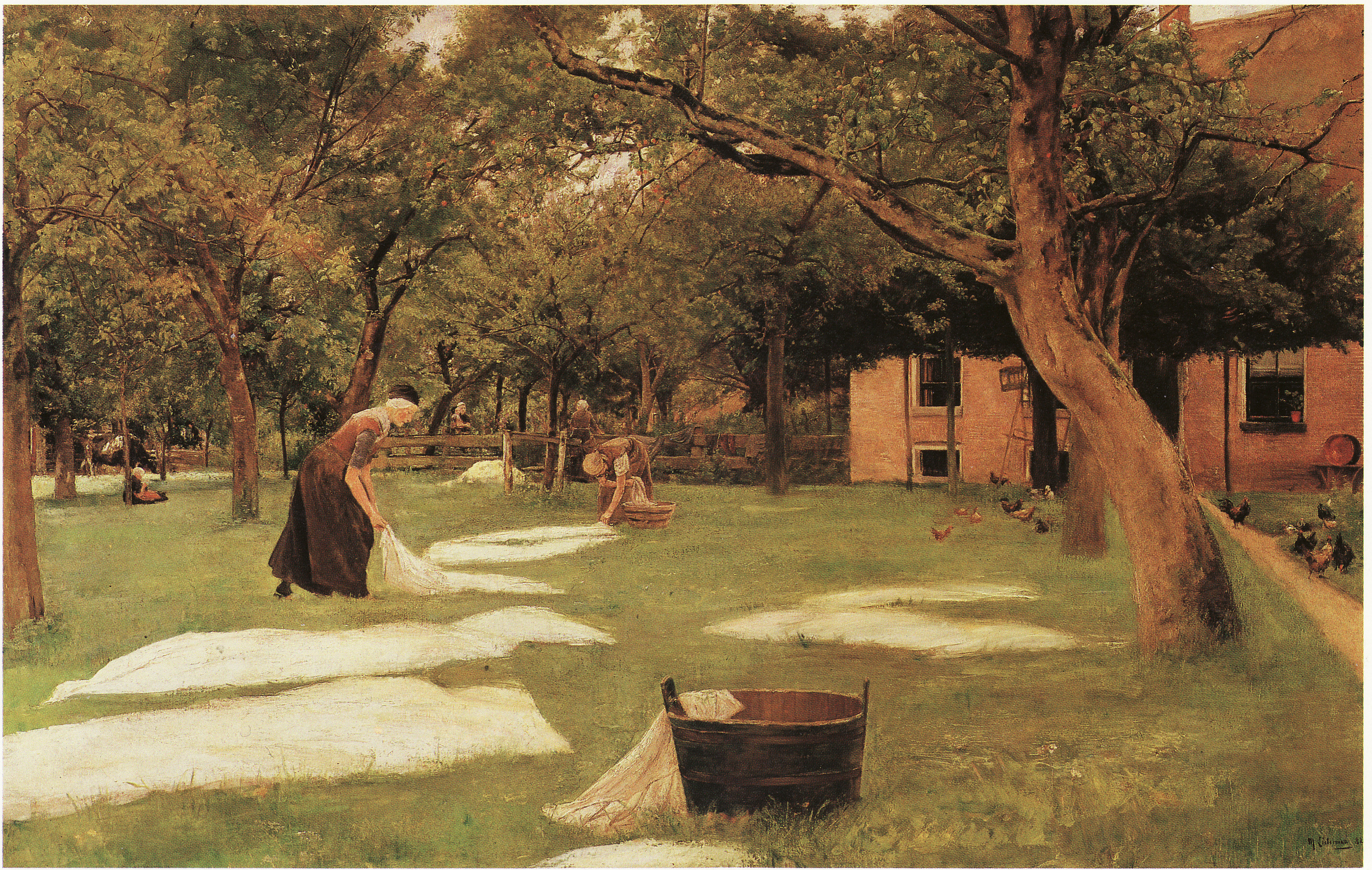
Bleaching on the Lawn, 1892

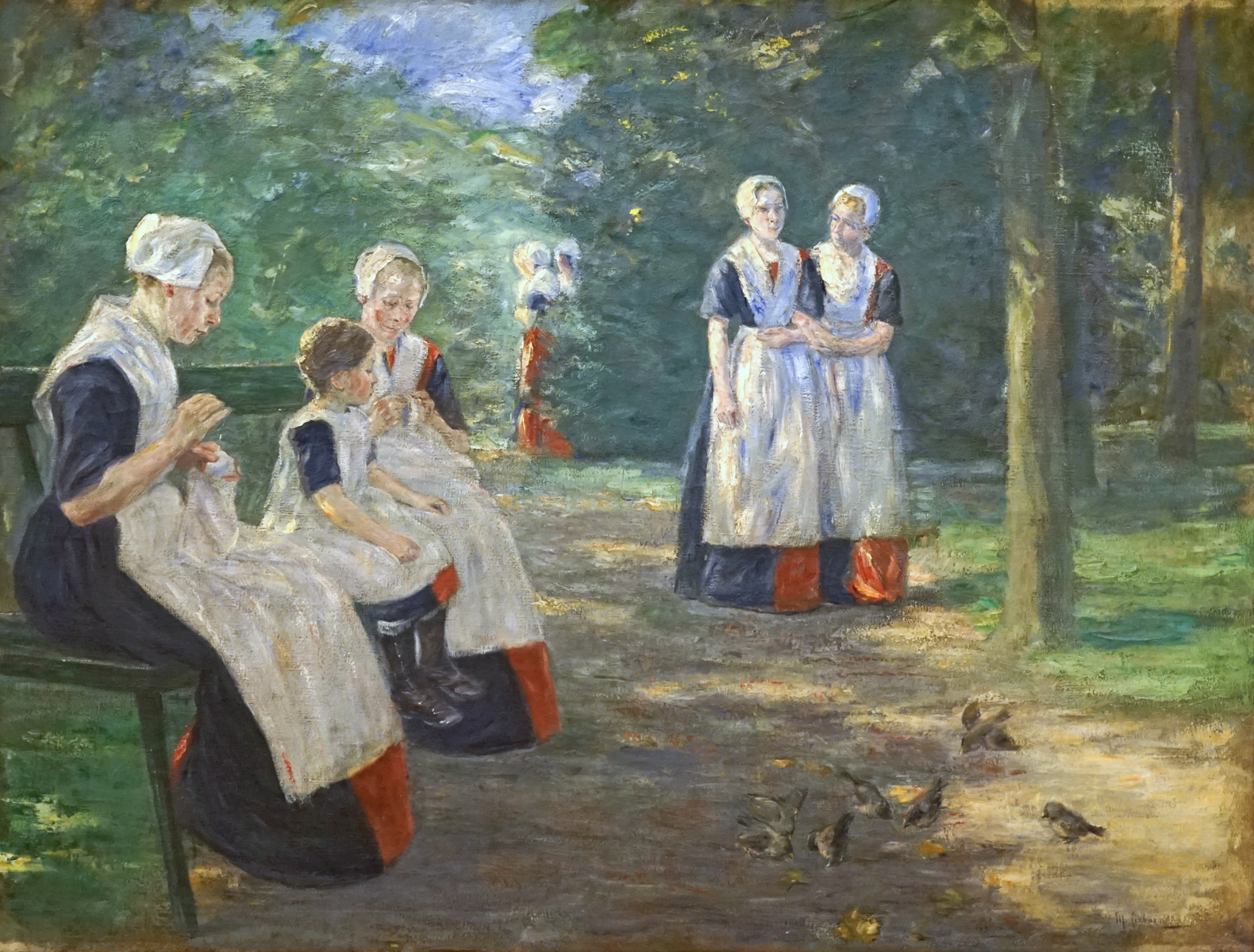
The Garden of the Orphanage in Amsterdam, 1894

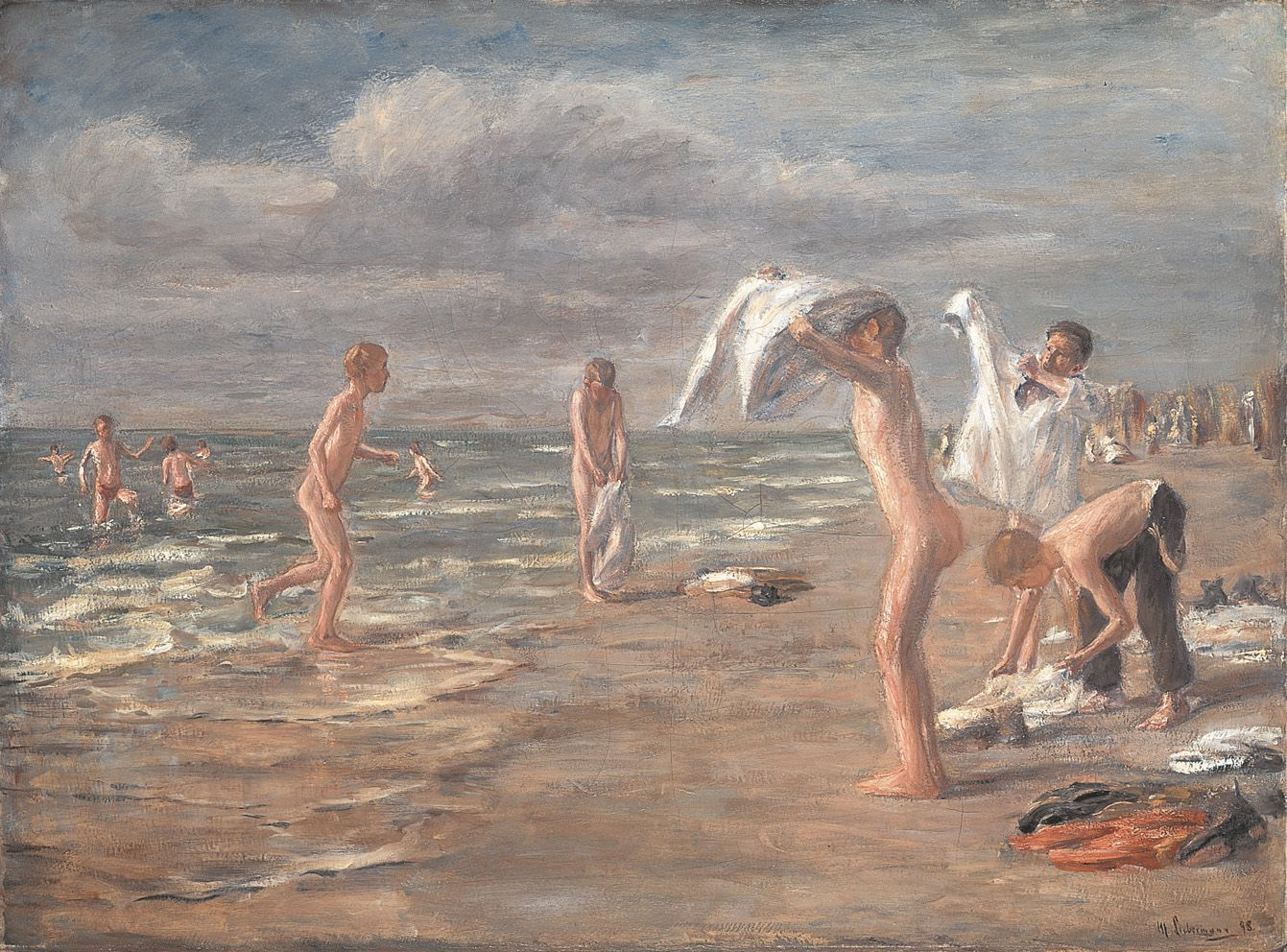
Boys Bathing, 1898

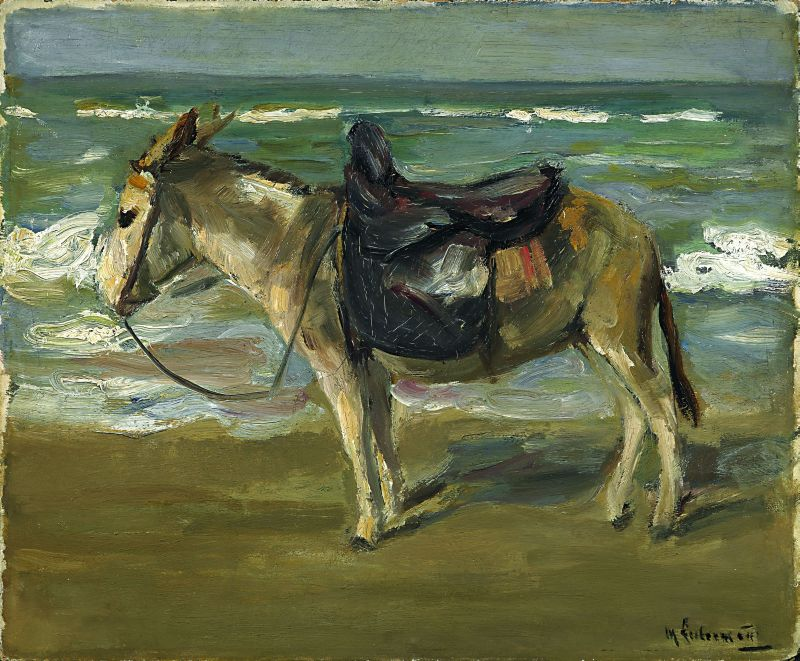
Riding Donkey at the Seashore, 1900

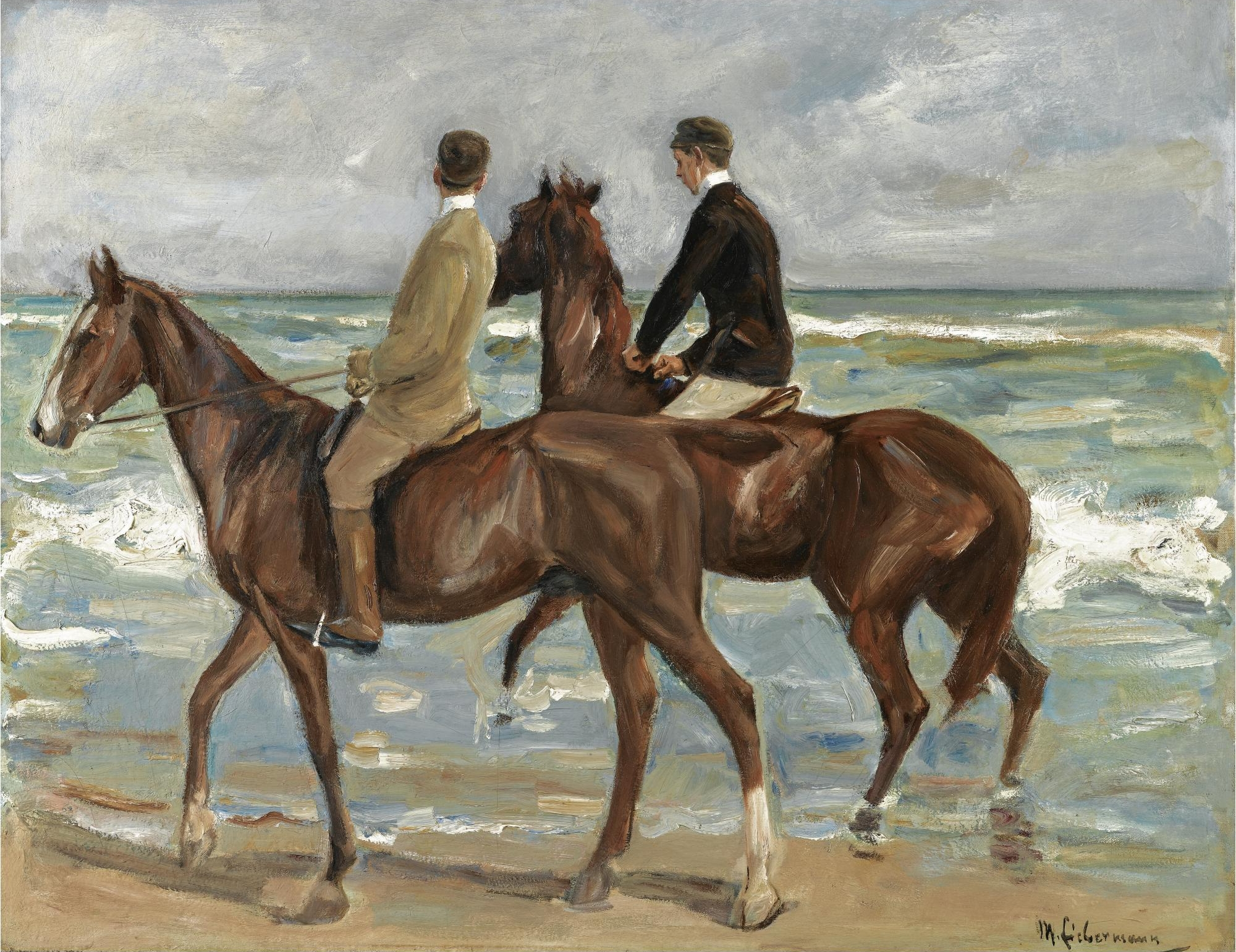
Two Riders on the Beach, 1901

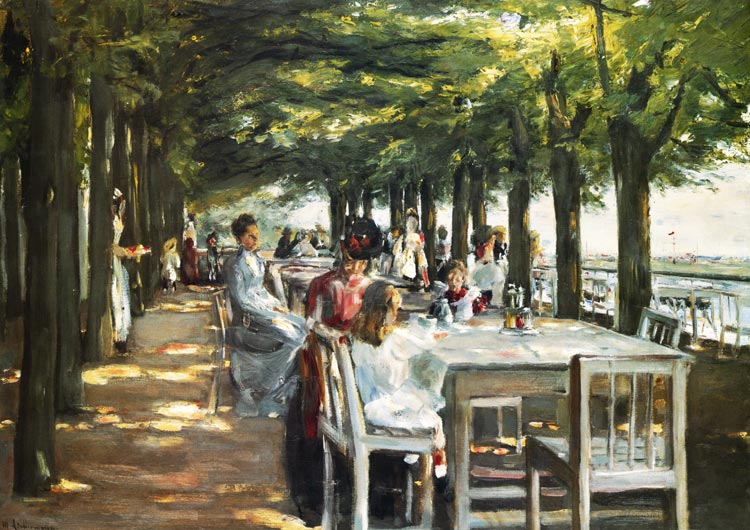
Restaurant Terrace in Nienstedten, 1902

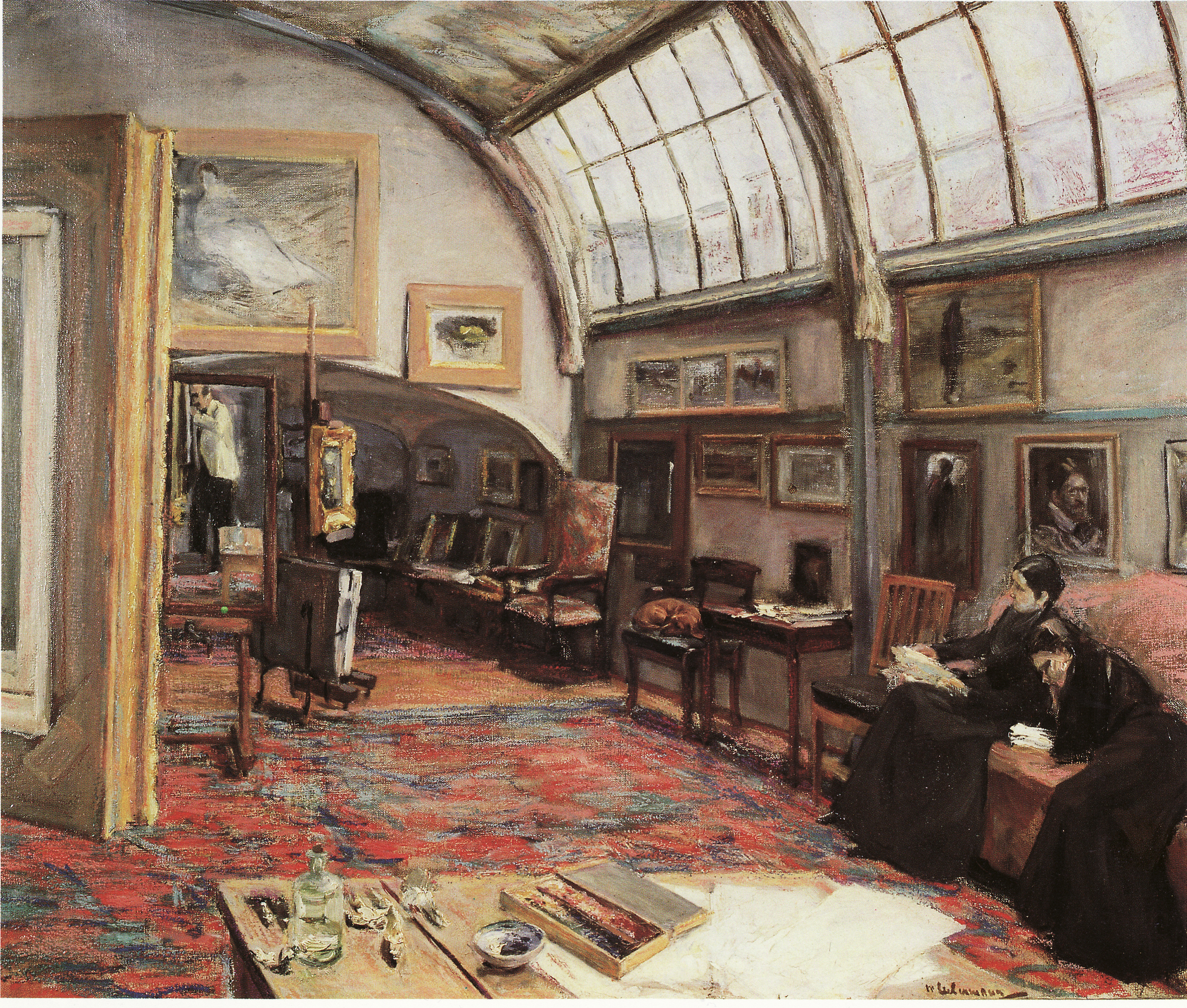
The Artist's Studio, 1902

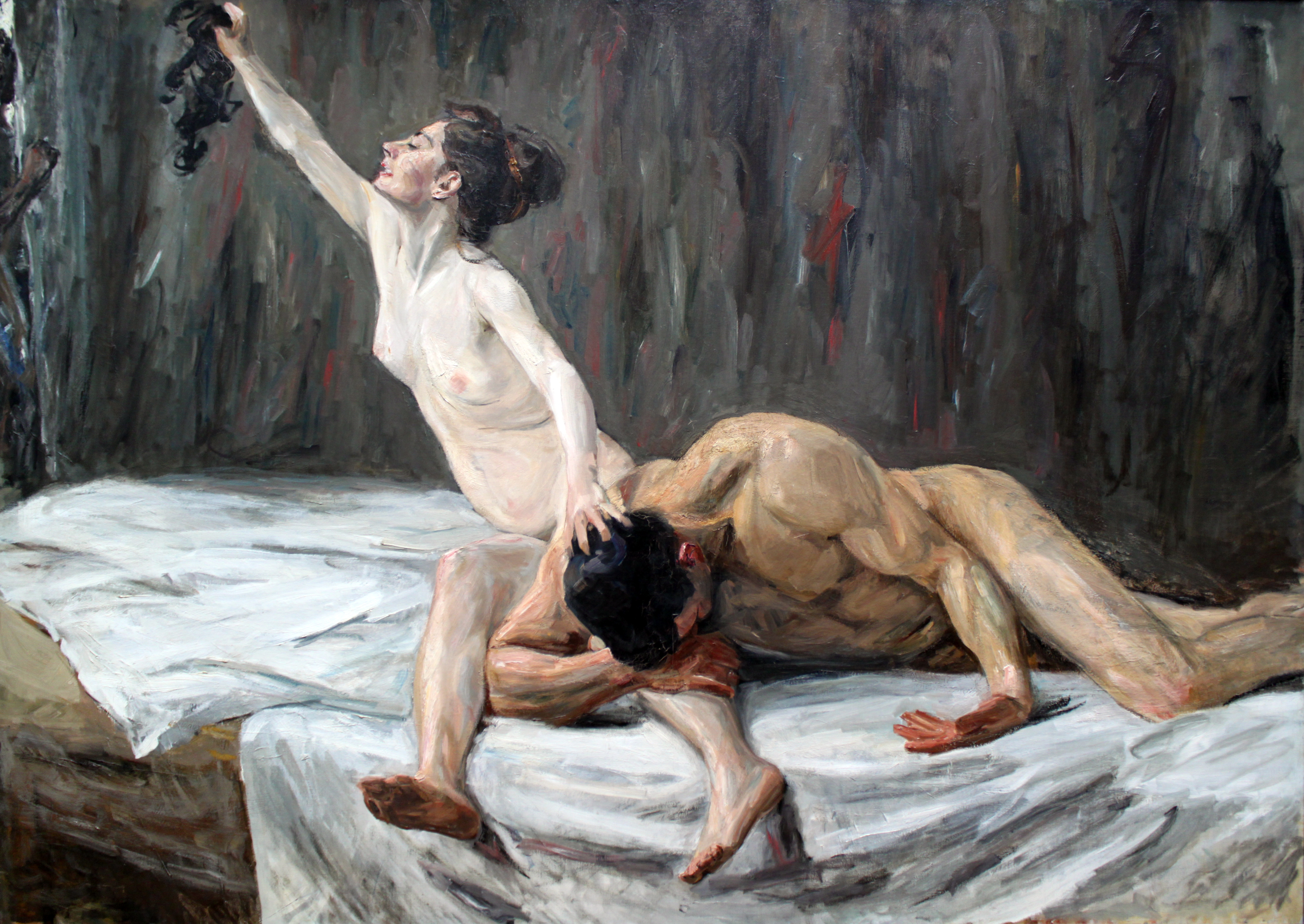
Samson and Delilah, 1902

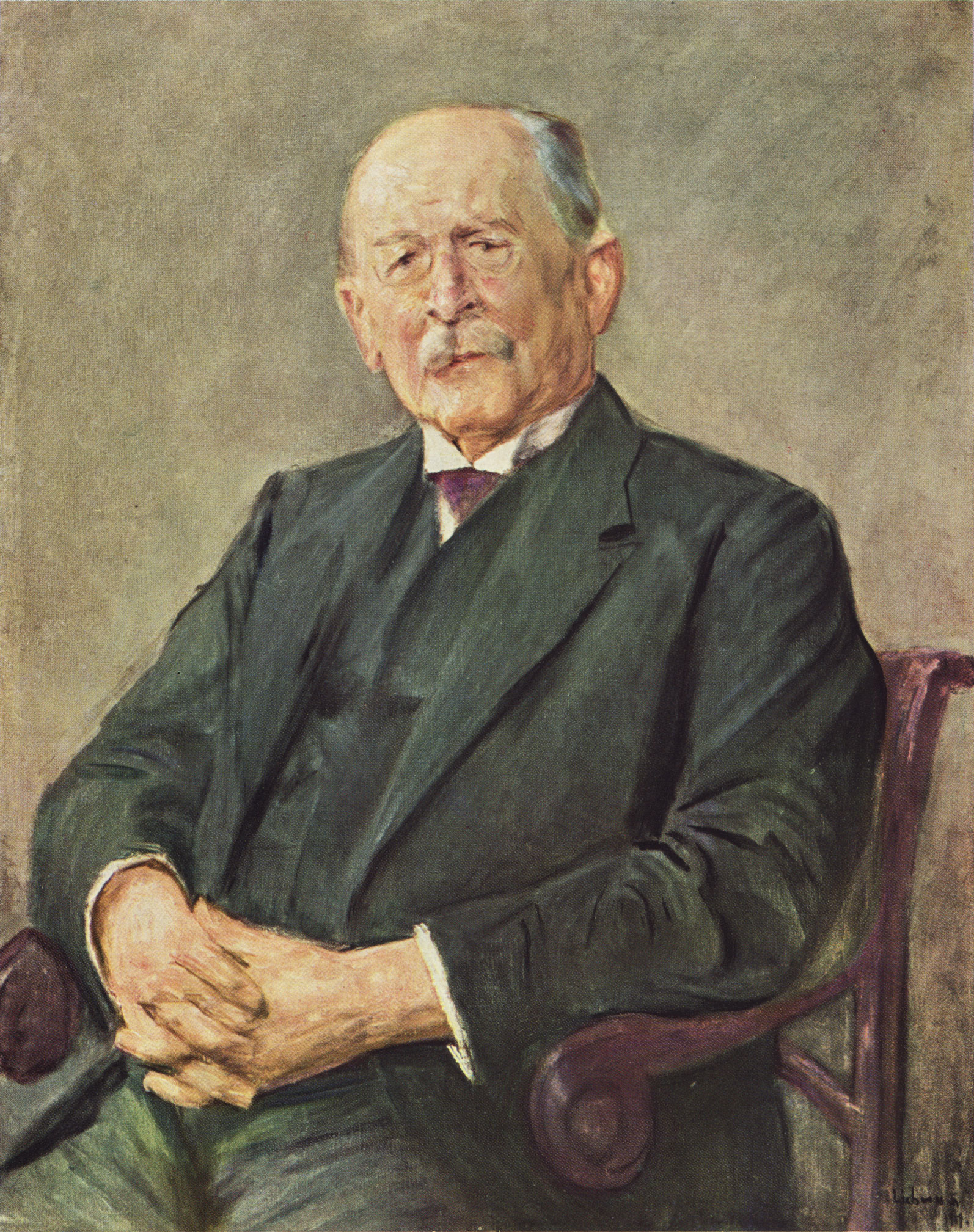
Portrait of Otto Gerstenberg, 1919
