= Princess of Zweeloo =

5th-century woman from the Netherlands

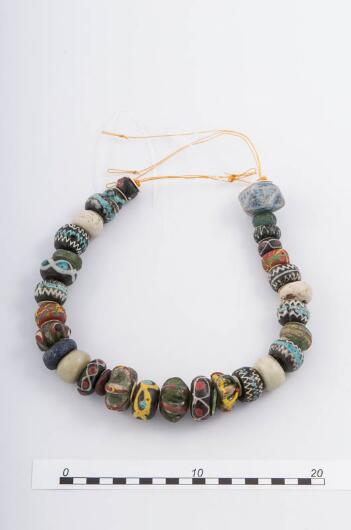
Glass beads found in her grave

The Princess of Zweeloo or Zweeeloo Princess was a 5th-century woman whose grave was found in 1952 in Zweeloo, Coevorden municipality, Drenthe province, Netherlands. Her nickname comes from the richness of the grave goods found in her grave.

Fragments of textile found in her grave show that she wore a linen gown with a woolen cloak or shawl. She had a collection of 30 large glass beads around her waist, and the beads from her amber necklace form the largest collection of amber found in the Netherlands. Other finds from her grave include a brooch, made in northern Germany, in the form of a butterfly; an amulet made from the tooth of a beaver; a silver ring; a bronze armband; two bronze keys, and silver toilet articles. Some of these objects are displayed in the Drents Museum, in Assen, where they are classed as one of the "top exhibits".

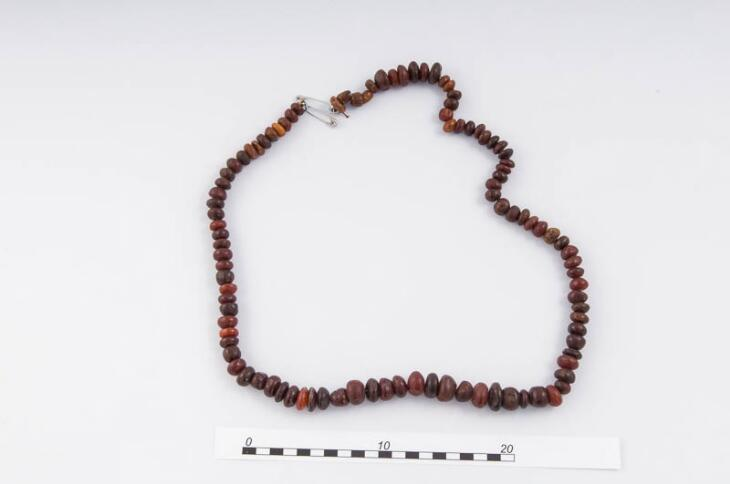
Her string of 101 amber beads

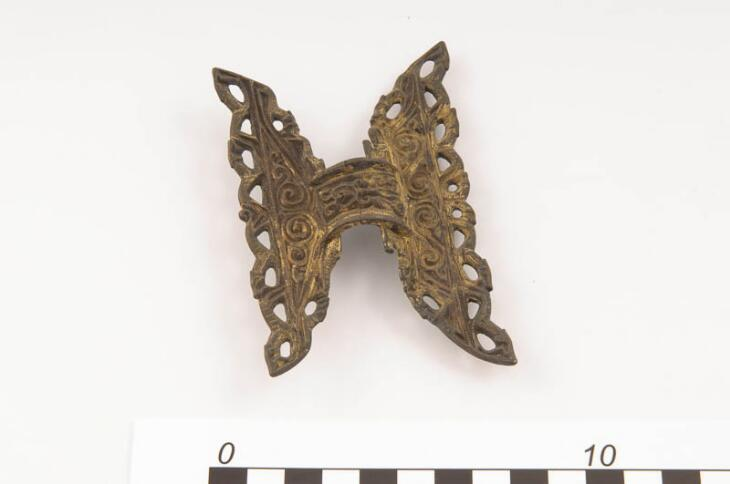
Her gilded bronze butterfly clasp

Her grave was one of a group of graves on the north eastern edge of a large excavation site. There are horse graves in the vicinity, and since horses were not buried as grave goods for women it is thought that her husband's grave may have been one of those lost to later sand extraction from the site.
