= Recreation Time in the Amsterdam Orphanage =

Painting by Max Liebermann

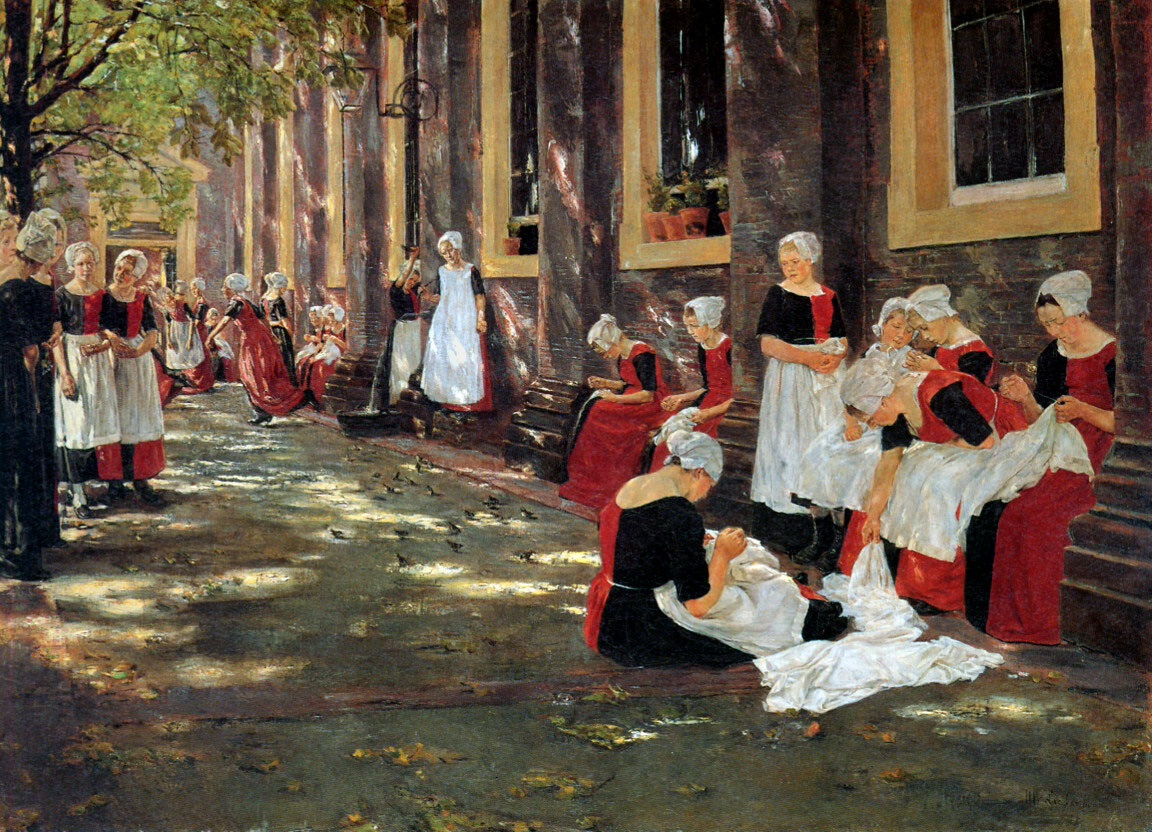
- Artist: Max Liebermann
- Year: 1881-1882
- Medium: oil on canvas
- Movement: Realism
- Dimensions: 78.5 cm × 107.5 cm (30.9 in × 42.3 in)
- Location: Städel, Frankfurt am Main

Recreation Time in the Amsterdam Orphanage (German: Freistunde im Amsterdamer Waisenhaus) is an oil on canvas painting by the German painter Max Liebermann, from 1881 to 1882. It depicts a scene that takes place in the courtyard of the orphanage in the Kalverstraat in Amsterdam. The style of the work is realistic with impressionistic tendencies. It is held in the Städel, in Frankfurt am Main.

== History ==
Liebermann often worked in the Netherlands. In the summer of 1876 he stayed in Haarlem, where he studied works by Frans Hals, with his friend, the etcher William Unger. From Haarlem he also often traveled to Amsterdam. He was fascinated with the hustle and bustle of the girls in the sunlit courtyard of the civic orphanage in the Kalverstraat. After much effort, and with Unger's help, he was given permission to paint there. Fellow painters were surprised to see him painting en plein air in a courtyard surrounded by girls, which was still very unusual at the time. In July he created several studies of the courtyard and the dining room of the orphanage.

The current painting was created a few years later, using previous sketches, in the winter of 1881/82, in Liebermann's studio in Munich. Some of Liebermann's paintings had attracted attention in the Paris Salon in 1880, and his treatment of sunlight was particularly praised. With the current painting, he transformed the sketches and impressions of the orphanage, his favorite Amsterdam subject, into a coherent work with a similar lighting mood.

== Description ==
The painting shows a scene in the courtyard of the orphanage. The residents are seen busy sewing and playing. The brick wall of the courtyard forms the perspective diagonal of the picture. In the foreground, on the right half of the canvas, a loose group of eight girls sits on benches along the wall and on the floor, in the shade; they are sewing white fabrics. The orphans' clothes are striking, they are composed of a red right half and a black left half. In the sunnier background, some girls are sewing, while others are playing catch. Under a gas lamp that is only sketched in the middle ground, a girl is operating a fountain. On the left edge, two girls are facing the viewer and a group of three larger girls are in conversation. The upper left corner of the painting is taken up by the light green leafy branches of a deciduous tree. The floor of the courtyard is unpaved, but bordered by bricks, and is enlivened by fallen yellow-green leaves and a group of sparrows.

Liebermann's early work was strongly rooted in realism, but because he painted plein air and paid great attention to color and light, he was soon counted among the impressionists. The Recreation Time in the Amsterdam Orphanage is an excellent example of these aspects of his work: on one hand, the complementary color palette of the spring green of the trees and potted plants and the red of the brick walls and the girls' dresses is striking, and on the other hand, his particular attention to lighting effects, which is expressed in the patches of light falling through the branches and the juxtaposition of the shadowy foreground and the sunny background.

== Provenance ==
Liebermann exhibited the painting at the Paris Salon in 1882, where it was bought by the Parisian singer Jean-Baptiste Faure. It later came to the art dealer Paul Durand-Ruel and was sold to Paul Cassirer in Berlin in 1899. In 1900, it was bought by the Städel Museum Association, shortly after its creation. During the Second World War, the painting was moved to Amorbach in 1945, where it was stolen. It was returned to the Städel Museum in 1964.
