= Two Riders on the Beach =

1901 paintings by Max Liebermann

- Zwei Reiter am Strand (German)
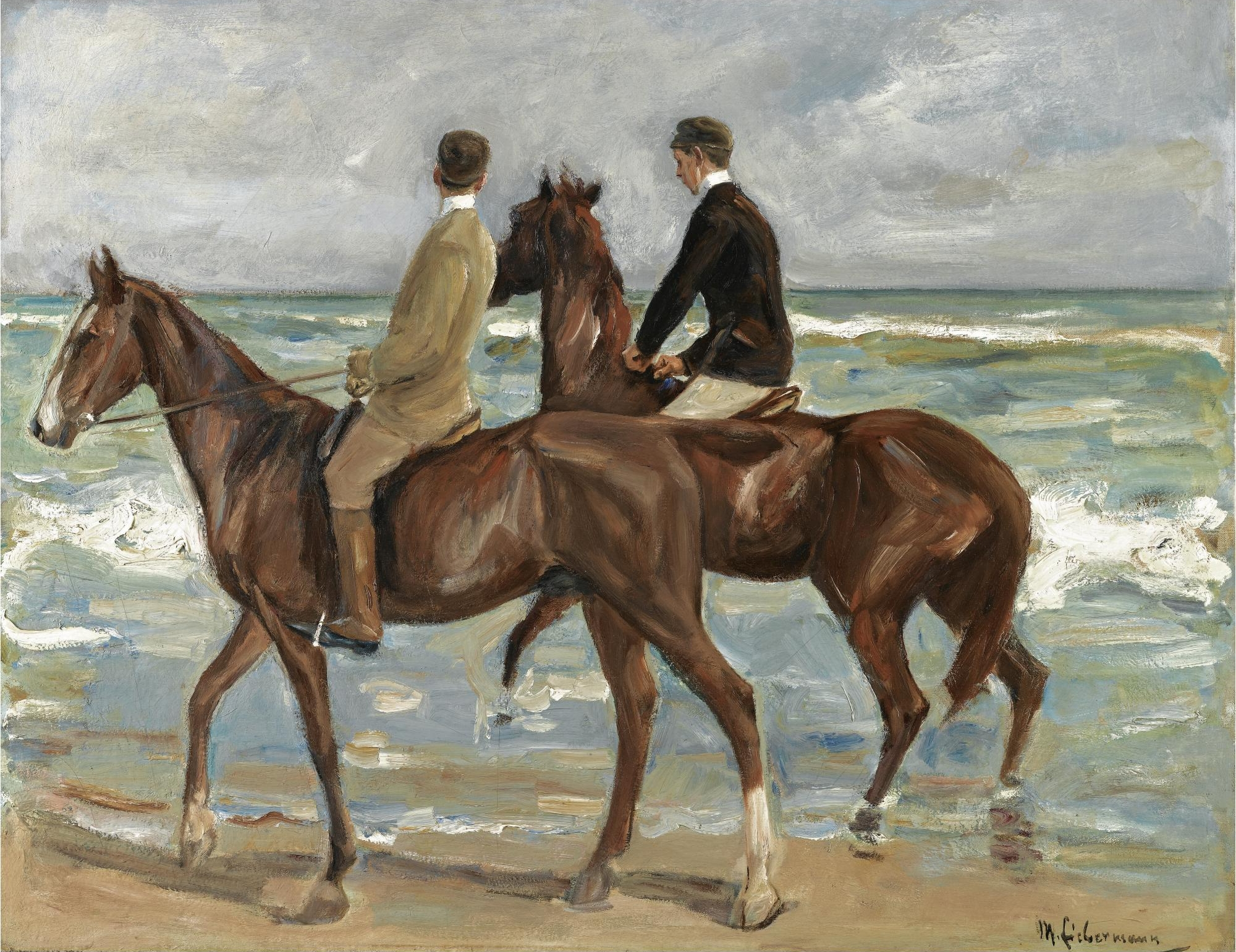
- Artist: Max Liebermann
- Year: 1901
- Medium: Oil on canvas
- Dimensions: 71 cm × 91 cm (28 in × 36 in)
- Location: Private collection

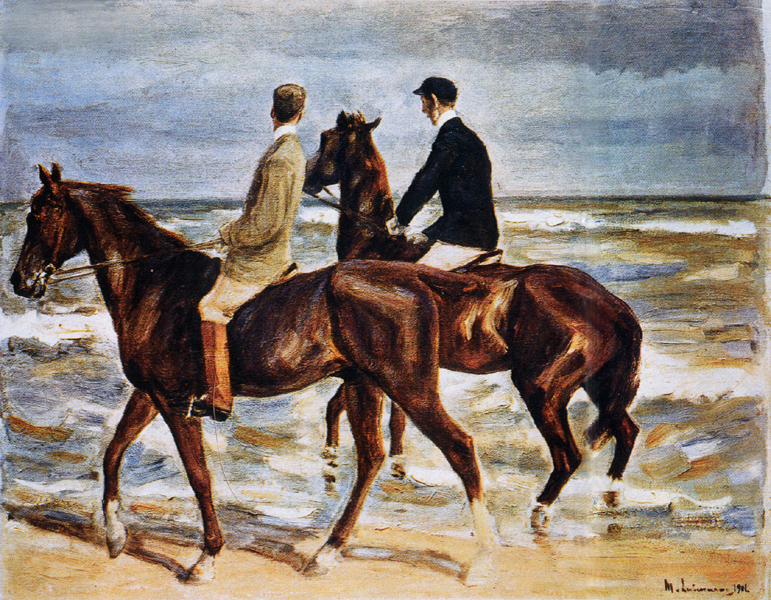
Version of the painting that was seized by the Nazis in 1938

Two Riders on the Beach (German: Zwei Reiter am Strand) is the title of two similar paintings by the German artist Max Liebermann. Both were painted in 1901 while Liebermann was on vacation in Scheveningen on the North Sea. The paintings are considered masterpieces of German impressionism, heavily influenced by the style of French impressionist painters Édouard Manet and Edgar Degas.

One of the paintings in the 1930s belonged to the collection of Jewish factory owner and art collector David Friedmann in Wrocław, then Breslau, Silesia. It was seized by the Nazi authorities shortly after the anti-Jewish Kristallnacht pogrom in 1938 and in 1942, one of Hitler's official art dealers, Hildebrand Gurlitt, acquired Two Riders on the Beach from "Aryan" auctionneer Hans W. Lange.

After World War II the painting was seized by Allied Monuments Men along with other works from Gurlitt's collection, and Gurlitt was investigated for his role in Nazi art looting by the Art Looting Investigation Unit.

"Amazingly," Susan Ronald wrote in Hitler's Art Thief: Hildebrand Gurlitt, the Nazis, and the Looting of Europe's Treasures,

Gurlitt engineered the release of some of his sequestered artwork after he made a final statement under oath regarding the buying and selling of art during the war. Of course, the fact that he declared that much of his collection had been verbrannt (burned) in the bombings of Hamburg and Dresden is now known to be utter fiction. Somehow he had made Edwin Rae, the chief of the Monument's, Fine Arts and Archives section in Munich, believe that four of his paintings in fact belonged to his cousin Brigitta.

— Hitler's Art Thief: Hildebrand Gurlitt, the Nazis, and the Looting of Europe's Treasures

In 2012, in an event that made headlines around the world, Hildebrand Gurlitt' son, Cornelius Gurlitt, was discovered to have a secret stash of paintings. The 2012 Munich artworks discovery led to the rediscovery of Two Riders on the Beach. The surviving family of David Friedman recognized the looted painting and demanded its return, which took place in 2015. "David Toren remembers staring at Max Liebermann's Two Riders on a Beach as his great-uncle signed over his estate to a Nazi general. Now his family has it back."

The painting was sold at Sotheby's by £1.865 millions ($2.92 millions) in June 2015.

The other painting was part of a private collection in New York City before it was sold at Sotheby's in 2009. The new owner was again a private collector. The paintings are very similar; one difference is that the one that was part of Friedmann's collection shows both forelegs of the second horse.

== See also ==
- List of claims for restitution for Nazi-looted art
- Hildebrand Gurlitt
- Kindertransport
