= Zweeloo =

Place in Drenthe, Netherlands

- Village
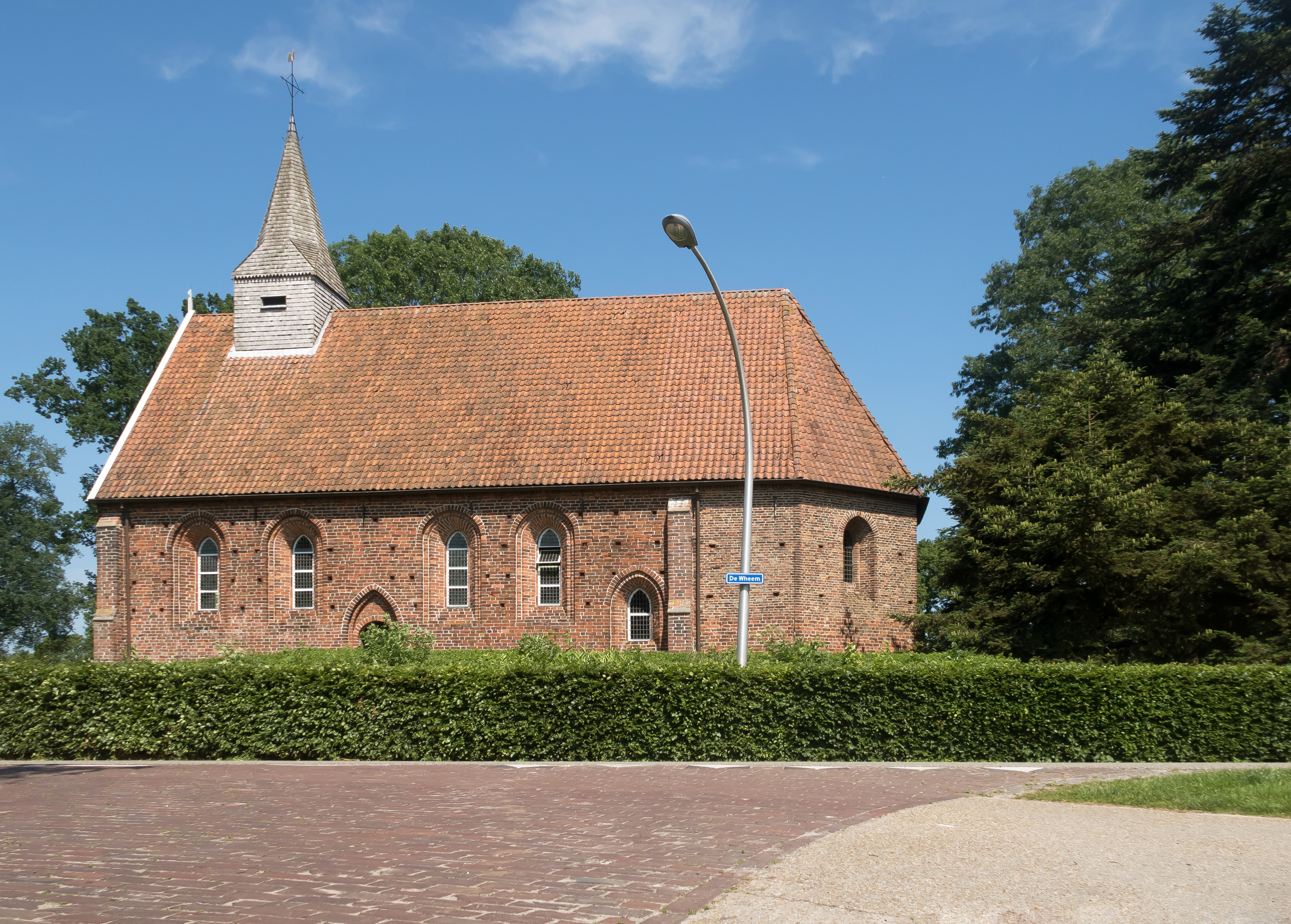
- Reformed church

- Coat of arms

- Location within Drenthe Location within Netherlands
- Coordinates: 52°47′37″N 6°43′49″E
- Country: Netherlands
- Province: Drenthe
- Municipality: Coevorden

Zweeloo is a village in the municipality of Coevorden, located in the province of Drenthe, in northeastern Netherlands.

Zweeloo was a separate municipality from 1819 to 1998, when it was merged with Coevorden. Zweeloo is known for its Reformed Church that was built back in 13th century.

== Monuments ==
The rural church of Zweeloo was erected in 1252. On a one-day trip from Veenoord, in November 1883, Vincent van Gogh brushed a well-known sketch of this church with a shepherd with his flock in the foreground.

In 1952 sand extraction revealed an early medieval cemetery near the village, where archaeologists found the grave of an apparent noblewoman known as the Princess of Zweeloo, with glass and amber beads.
