= The Twelve-Year-Old Jesus in the Temple =

Painting by Max Liebermann

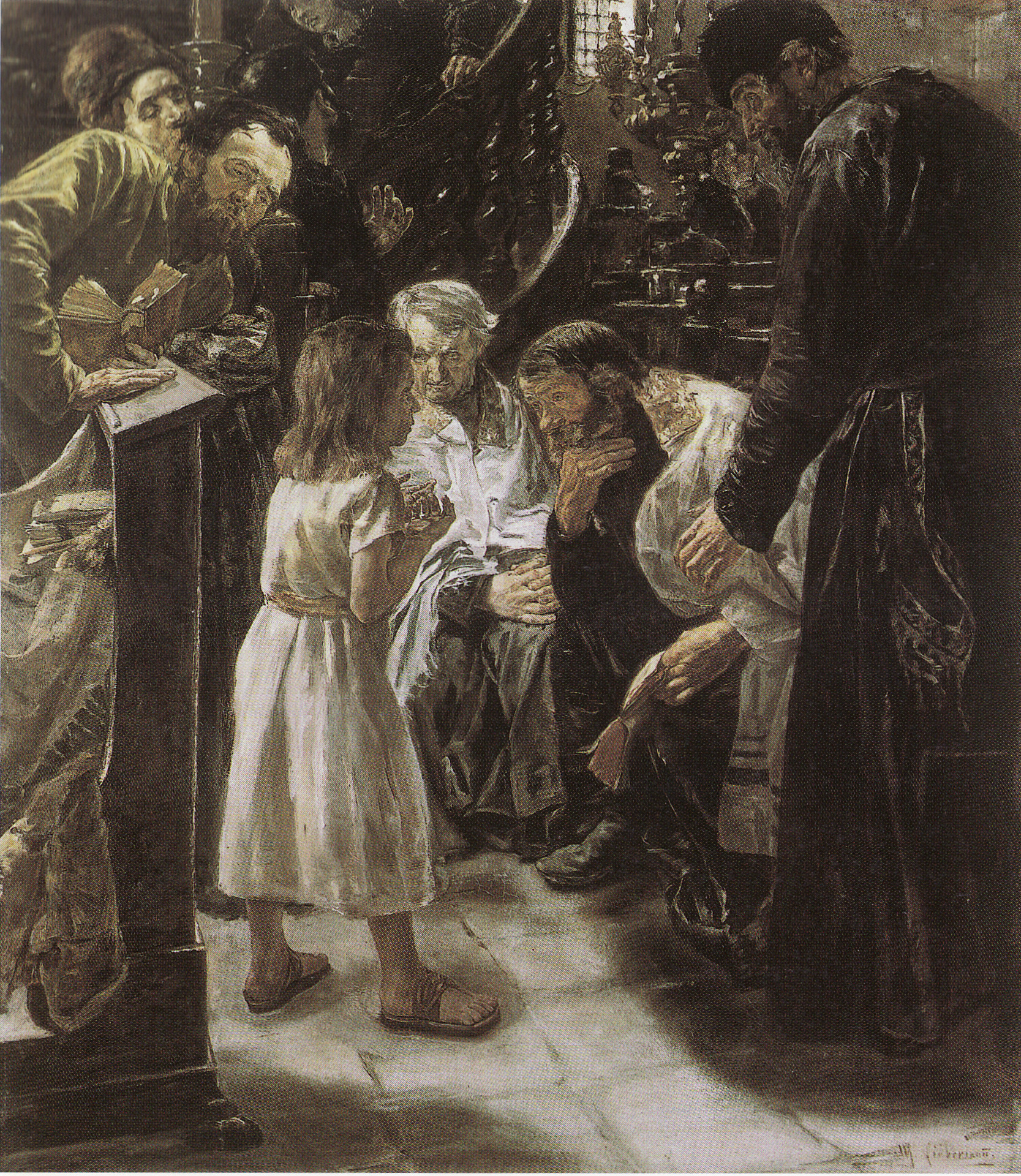
- Artist: Max Liebermann
- Year: 1879
- Medium: Oil on canvas
- Movement: Realism
- Dimensions: 149.6 cm × 130.8 cm (58.9 in × 51.5 in)
- Location: Hamburger Kunsthalle, Hamburg

The Twelve-Year-Old Jesus in the Temple is an oil-on-canvas painting by German painter Max Liebermann, created in 1879. It is held at the Hamburger Kunsthalle.

== History ==
The episode of the twelve-year-old Jesus in the temple is taken from the Gospel of Luke (Lk 2.42-50), and is often depicted in Christian art, for example in cycles on the life of Mary.

Liebermann had the idea for this painting when he visited the Jewish quarter of Amsterdam in 1876. Liebermann was following in the footsteps of Rembrandt, so to speak. He made the first architectural sketches of the Portuguese synagogue while there. In 1878 further studies were made in the Sephardic Synagogue, in Venice; Liebermann took the curved staircase from here, which would be later implemented as a spiral staircase in the painting.

Both Rembrandt's depiction of the subject in two etchings and a painting by Matthias Stom, then attributed to Gerrit van Honthorst, which he probably saw in the Alte Pinakothek, in Munich, influenced Liebermann's design of the group of figures. The lighting, on the other hand, was influenced by Giambattista Tiepolo.

The Dutch Caravaggist Matthias Stom had the idea of putting Jesus and the scribes on an equal footing by depicting the child standing and his adult interlocutors sitting (c. 1640/45); Liebermann followed this influence.

At the end of 1878, Liebermann settled in Munich and began his individual studies of the figures, the arrangement of which more or less corresponded to the later painting. According to his own statements, he found his models in Munich hospitals.

== Description ==
Liebermann designed a room reminiscent of a synagogue of the 19th century with its chandelier, lectern and benches. The light is depicted as coming from above. Present are several standing and seated men, who are grouped around the standing Child Jesus. In the center of the composition the viewer sees Jesus and two seated Jewish scholars, who are dressed in tallit and are listen intently to the boy. They are at eye level with the standing child and together they form the central group of three people, a semicircle open to the viewer. Their togetherness is also underlined in color by the white prayer shawls or the child's tunic. The trousers and the fact that one of the two seated men is shaved, contrary to Jewish tradition, indicate the bourgeois status of these two people, while the other synagogue visitors seem to be somewhat poorer.

To the left of this group is a modernly dressed man in a green suit bending over the lectern, and to the right there is a tall, slightly stooped man in a black caftan and a fur hat named spodik; he turns his back on the viewer and is reminiscent of a traditional Eastern European Jew, like those who would be occasionally found on the streets of Berlin at Liebermann's time. These two men frame the scene. In a preliminary study, the man dressed in green smiles as if amused by the child's zeal; in the painting the facial expression is different, because he seems genuinely interested. The fact that he and the two seated men in a synagogue are not wearing a head covering is a further break with tradition. Liebermann may have wanted to represent members of Reform Judaism, but that is uncertain.

In the background, the viewer can see a spiral staircase that seems to lead to the women's hall. A woman descends the stairs – the viewer, with knowledge of the Gospel, identifies her as Mary, the mother of Jesus, who was looking for her son. The fact that her face is cut off by the frame underscores the urgency of her arrival. A dark-clad man with sidelocks turns to her from the group of men in the foreground, thus he is identified as Jesus' foster father Saint Joseph. However, Liebermann gives these two figures in the painting a very minor role.

Before the overpainting, the barefoot Jesus wore a kind of irregularly draped antique tunic, thus contrasting with the contemporary dressed persons who surrounded him. He had dark, or possibly reddish, short hair and side curls. The boy was seen in profile, with his nose relatively large for a child, and with his chin pointed. With a lunge, the boy turns to his interlocutors. The gesturing hands apparently indicated that he was involved in a lively argument.

After the revision, Jesus became dressed in a calf-length, regularly falling white robe and wearing sandals. He now had shoulder-length blond hair and soft, androgynous features. His arms are now closer to the body, the gestures of the hands were reduced, so that Jesus now appears more introverted or modest.

== Reception ==
Liebermann's painting was shown at the International Art Exhibition in the Glaspalast, in Munich Glaspalast in 1879. It was immediately noticed. Some German artists such as Wilhelm Leibl, Heinrich von Zügel and Lorenz Gedon praised the depiction of the Biblical event. But even at the opening of the exhibition, Prince Regent Luitpold von Bayern and the royal family reacted negatively.The painting was said to have been moved for this reason, but this can no longer be verified.

Reviews from both the local and national press were negative, like those of other realist works exhibited back then. These works were considered crude and trivial because they did not correspond to the idealistic view of art that had prevailed until that point.

The current painting also faced the accusation of blasphemy. Liebermann apparently dispensed with any reference to the divinity of the Jesus child; he seems to be a simple Jewish boy. Liebermann seems to have interpreted the episode of Luke's Gospel from a non-Christian perspective. Art critic Friedrich Pecht wrote that Liebermann's treatment of the biblical narrative was purely humorous and without religious reverence – a witty child who makes fun of a few old people. In his view, Liebermann portrayed Jesus as "the ugliest, snobby Jewish boy imaginable" and the rabbis as a "pack of the sleakiest haggling Jews". Letters in the local press also attacked Liebermann as a Jew who had, in their opinions, offended Christian sensibilities.
