= Laying out the March Dead =

German painting by Adolph Menzel

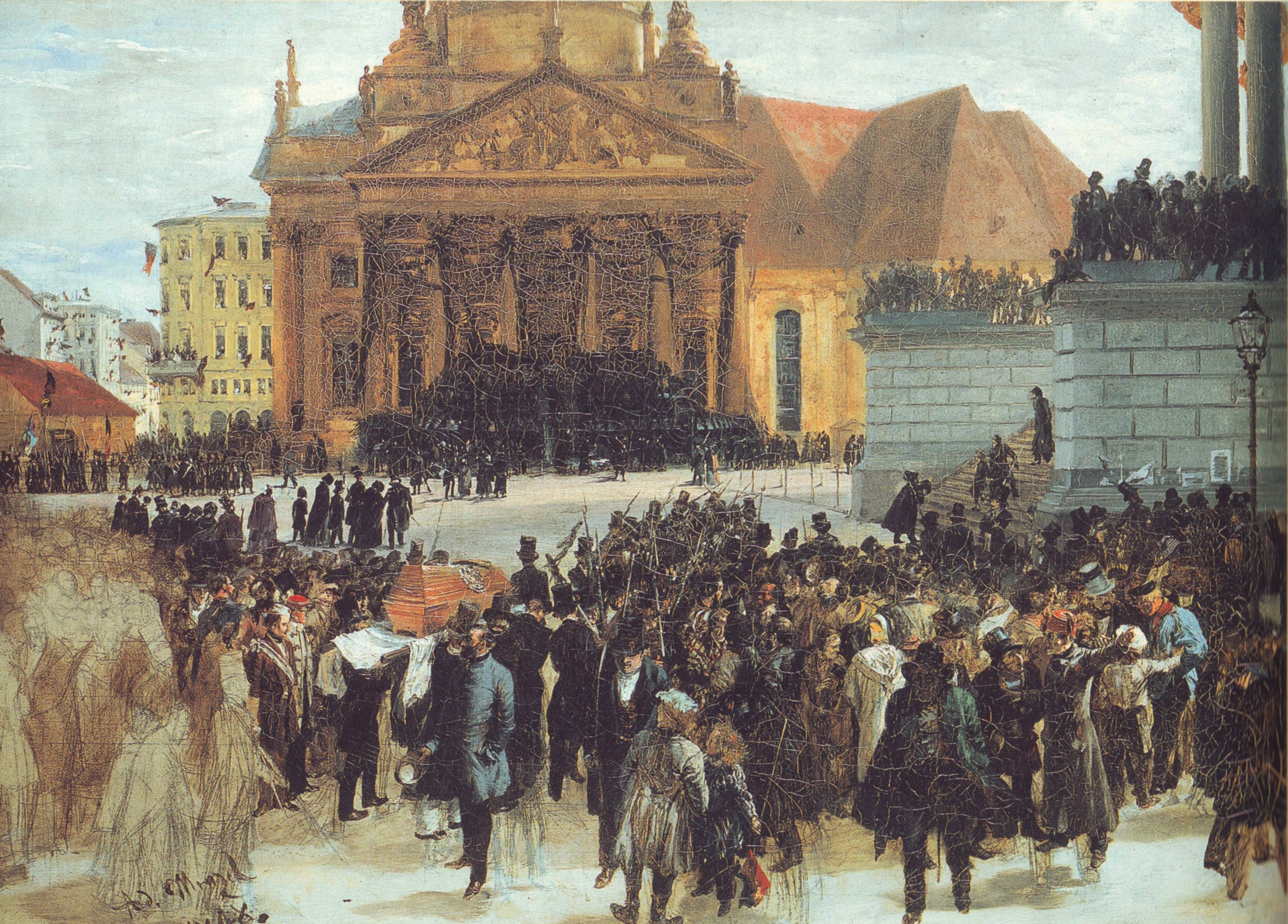
- Artist: Adolph Menzel
- Year: 1848
- Medium: oil on canvas
- Dimensions: 45 cm × 63 cm (18 in × 25 in)
- Location: Hamburger Kunsthalle, Hamburg

Laying out the March Dead (German: Aufbahrung der Märzgefallenen) is an oil painting by the German artist Adolph Menzel, from 1848. It shows a crowd of people on Berlin's Gendarmenmarkt. The figures are attending the Coffin Laying of civilians who died during the Berlin March Revolution. Menzel attended the ceremony and during the event – or shortly afterward – he began work on the first studies for the painting. The lower left corner of the painting is not executed in oil paint, which is why most scholars consider it to be unfinished. Art historians disagree about the possible political or aesthetic motives of the painter for this. The painting belongs to the group of revolutionary paintings that were rarely created in Germany.

Menzel did not follow the guidelines of traditional history painting with his painting. On the one hand, art critics categorized it as "historical painting of the present", on the other hand, the classification as "historical painting" was rejected altogether. The Laying out of the March Fallen initially played no role in public perception, as it remained in the painter's artist's studio. Shortly before the turn of the century, it was sold to a private gallery in Zurich and only came into the possession of the Hamburger Kunsthalle in 1902, which made it accessible to the public for the first time.

== Description ==
The painting is an oil paint canvas measuring 45 × 63 centimeters. The viewer looks slightly elevated over a crowd of people gathered in front of the northern portico of the German Cathedral on Berlin's Gendarmenmarkt. Most of the coffins have already been placed on the steps of the church. They form a pyramid-shaped, blurred-looking dark spot, which is shifted slightly to the left of the center of the painting. In its center – at the height of the horizontal horizon line – is the vanishing point of the painting. The central axis of the picture is emphasized on the left by a group of mourners and on the right by the staircase walls of the Schauspielhaus.

The crowd in the foreground takes up most of the picture. It makes way for another light brown coffin, which is also to be placed on the steps of the German Cathedral. Most people have their eyes on the coffins, but some are engrossed in conversation. As the American historian Peter Paret assumes, they seem to be discussing the events of the last few days and the future. More people can be seen in front of the staircase wall of the theater, reading the announcements posted there.

The Berlin vigilante group has taken up position next to the light brown coffin. It prevents spectators from entering the immediate vicinity of the coffins set up on the cathedral steps. A group of three figures attempting to bypass the barrier from the steps of the Schauspielhaus are turned back by a member of the vigilante group. Two of them are already about to turn back. However, the third person remains standing and looks towards the coffins. On the right-hand edge of the picture, several figures have settled on the walls of the playhouse, probably for a better view. In the left background, black-red-gold flags adorn several houses. They symbolize the demand for national unity of Germany. The national colors also appear in the foreground: On the right, below the light brown coffin, a little girl is listlessly carrying a black, red and gold flag upside down while talking to a taller girl. Next to both, a gentleman in a green coat appears to be facing the viewer. He is the largest-looking figure in the picture, which also stands out from its surroundings due to its darker appearance. The dome of the German Cathedral is left out of the picture.

Menzel captured the social heterogeneity of the crowd; we can see bourgeoisie, craftsmen, students and members of the militia, as well as some women, children and a worker. According to Peter Paret, most of the people depicted belong to groups that made up the majority of the barricade fighters, above all journeymen, master craftsmen and the social middle class. Although uniforms were usually worn at public gatherings, most citizens – apart from the students – were dressed in civilian clothes. Although the figures form themselves partially around the coffin, they do not take up a ceremonial position.

The underdrawing in the lower left corner of the picture was not painted over in color. The area also contains the artist's signature "Ad. Menzel 1848" and two mourning female figures. Their gaze is directed towards the ground. To their right, a male figure belonging to the militia is looking at the coffin being carried towards the church. He carries a rifle over his shoulder and strikes an upright, proud pose. To his left, several students form a trellis around the coffin. In the foreground of the scene, a gentleman in upper-class dress has pulled out his top hat. He is paying his respects to the coffin, but also to the man of the vigilante group. At the same time, his gaze is turned away from the actual events in front of the German Cathedral. The figure keeps his left hand in a coat pocket and stands in an empty, semi-circular space.

== History ==
=== The historical event and the artist ===
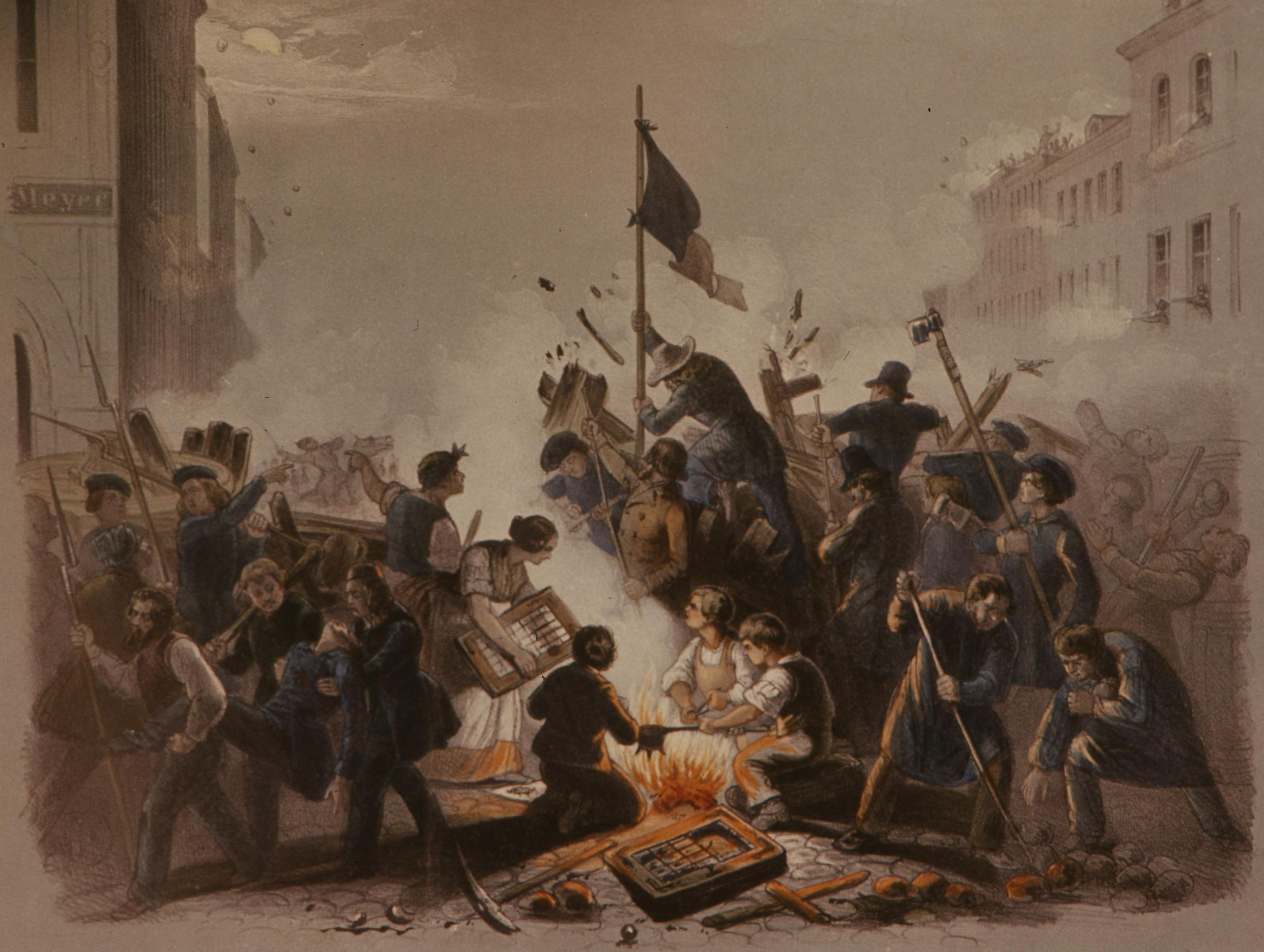
Barricade on Kronenstrasse and Friedrichstrasse, F. G. Nordmann, 1848

The painter of the picture Adolph Menzel was one of the most important representatives of Realism, a style of unembellished, detailed pictorial representation. During his long life (1815–1905), the artist witnessed numerous socio-political events. These included the political developments of the Revolutionary Year 1848, which were inextricably linked to the painting. This year saw violent confrontations in European capitals such as Paris and Vienna. On March 18/19, heavy street fighting between civilians and royal soldiers also took place in Berlin. The aims of the insurgents in Berlin included a liberal Prussian constitution, freedom of the press and a German nation state. More than 300 civilians and 20 soldiers fell victim to the fighting. The revolutionaries who died went down in history as the so-called March martyrs. After King Frederick William IV was unable to resolve the situation in the streets of Berlin militarily in his favour and withdrew his soldiers from Berlin, the burial of the March martyrs was organized.

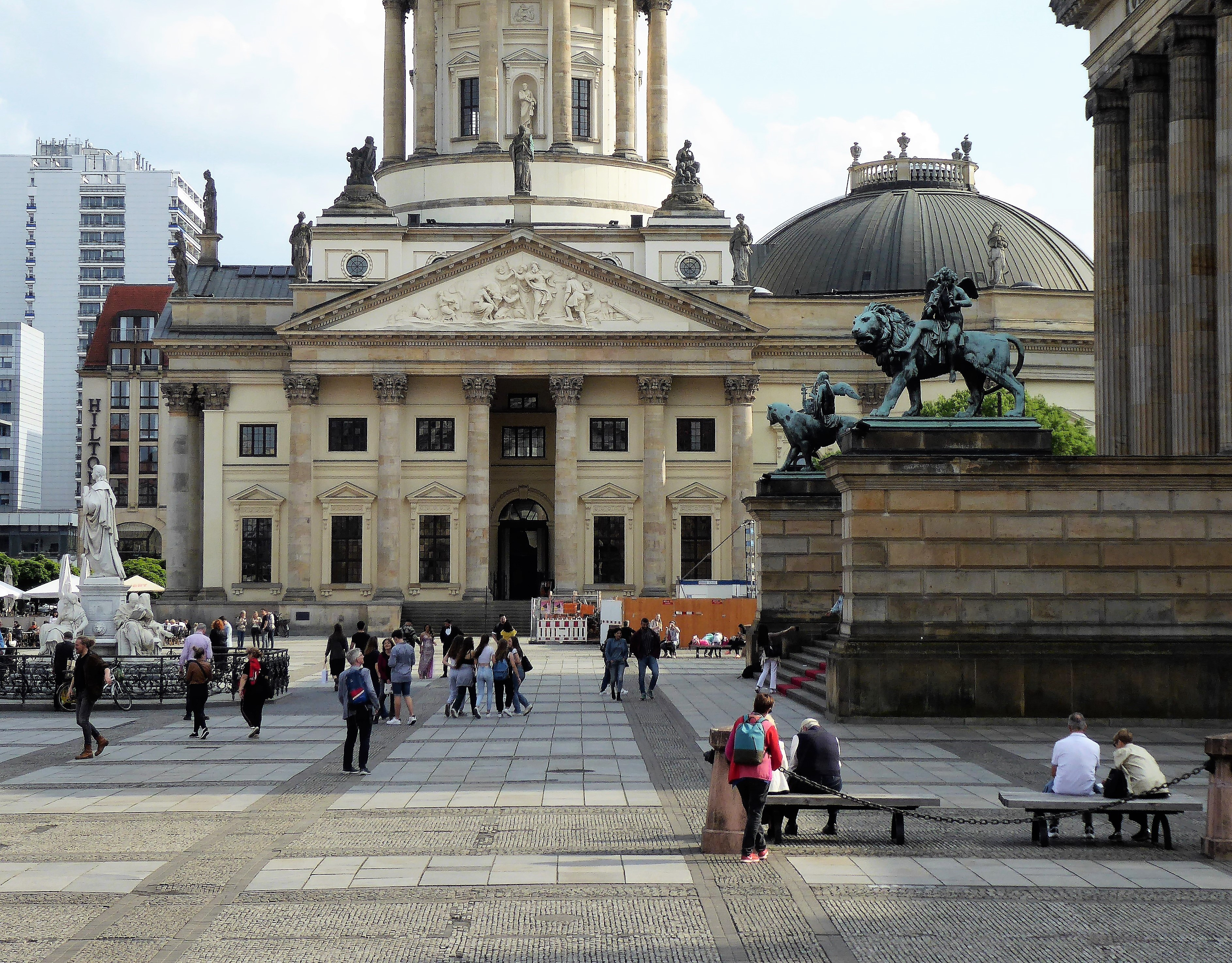
The Gendarmenmarkt 2022, scene of the laying out of the body in 1848

Menzel stayed in Kassel during the fighting. He only returned to the Prussian capital on March 21, 1848. On the same day, he visited the remains of barricades and looked at bullet holes in the walls. On the morning of March 22, 1848, he probably took part in the funeral of the March martyrs. The ceremony began on the Gendarmenmarkt: the coffins of 183 fallen soldiers, decorated with wreaths and ribbons, were laid out on the steps of the German Cathedral. Menzel most likely observed this scene from the steps of the French Cathedral. It was precisely this perspective that he later depicted in the painting.

Those gathered at the Gendarmenmarkt expressed their solidarity with the March martyrs. They came from all walks of life, including merchants, members of the Berlin Craftsmen's Association, factory workers from the locomotive manufacturer August Borsig and delegations from other cities. There are different contemporary accounts of how many thousands of people took part in the memorial service. According to current estimates, however, there were around 20,000 participants. At midday, Protestant, Catholic and Jewish clergymen held sermons in the German Cathedral. After the end of the short services, the funeral procession set off in the direction of the specially created Cemetery of the March Fallen outside the city gates. There, the March soldiers were buried in their coffins.

Menzel described his impressions to his friend and patron, the wallpaper manufacturer Carl Heinrich Arnold, in a letter as follows:

Das war ein traurig feierlicher Tag, dergleichen in Berlin zu erleben, man nicht gedacht hätte. […] Über den Verlauf des großartigen Leichenbegängnisses sehen Sie die Berliner Zeitungen nach.

Menzel also witnessed another symbolic act. As the coffins approached the Berlin City Palace, the crowd called on the king and his entourage to remove their headgear in honor of the March martyrs. Menzel wrote: "As often as a new procession of coffins passed by, the king stepped out bareheaded and remained standing until the coffins had passed. His head shone from afar like a white spot. It must have been the most terrible day of his life". Statements such as these prove that Menzel felt pity for the king on the one hand, but was also enthusiastic about the events on the other. As Menzel also drew the graves of the March martyrs in Friedrichshain, the art historian Werner Busch assumes that he accompanied the funeral procession to the end.

=== Preliminary studies and work on the painting ===
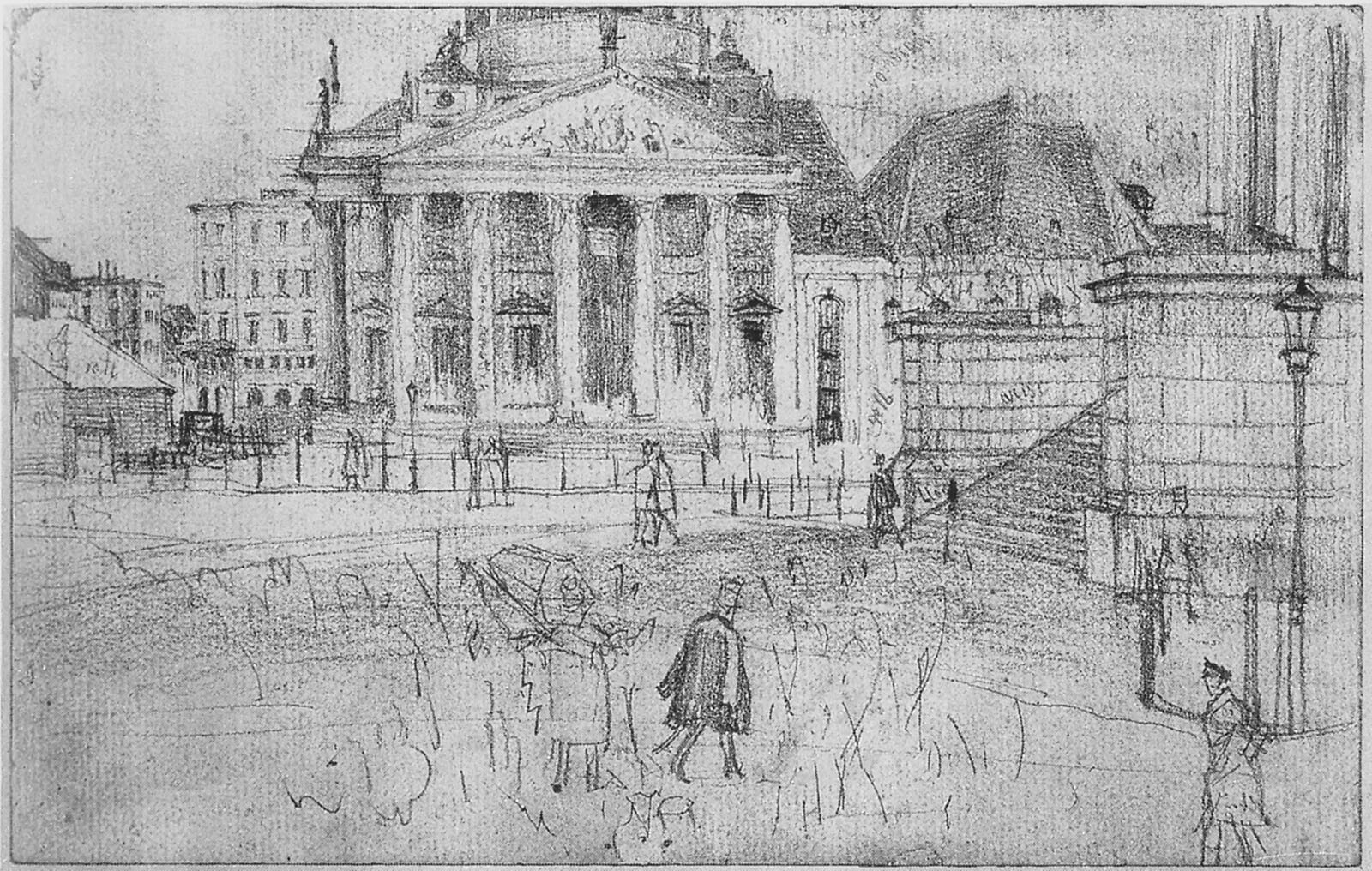
Menzel's Laying in State of the March Fallen (study), 1848, Kupferstichkabinett, Staatliche Museen, Berlin

March 22, 1848 initially seemed to symbolize the victory of the revolution in Berlin. Impressed by this, Menzel began to create the painting Laying in State of the March Fallen. The painting was intended to show the Gendarmenmarkt in the morning shortly before the actual start of the funeral service. About half a century after the events, Menzel recalled that he was "on his feet, almost like a newspaper reporter, sketching". In fact, several pencil drawings have survived in the artist's sketchbook. They can be used to trace the process of creating the painting. The majority of these preliminary studies mainly show architectural elements of the Gendarmenmarkt. The few human figures still in the foreground are only referred to with lines. The laid-out coffins of the March dead do not yet appear in the drawings. Only one coffin carried to the German Cathedral can already be seen in the center of the picture. The sketch still shows several passers-by who are apparently trying to cross the Gendarmenmarkt. Menzel left them out of the painting.

When Menzel began the preparatory work for the painting is the subject of debate among art historians. Werner Busch assumes that the drawings known to researchers were created after the funeral ceremony. He bases his assumption on the absence of flags and laid-out coffins, which were still visible during the ceremony. Both elements only reappear in the oil version. It is more likely that Menzel was busy sketching groups of people on the Gendarmenmarkt during the event itself. However, the preparatory work for this was lost. Christopher B. With assumes different circumstances of origin: According to him, the initial preparatory work, which was only carried out fleetingly, suggests that Menzel was too emotionally overwhelmed during the funeral ceremony to capture details such as groups of people on the Gendarmenmarkt in drawings. As a consequence, he would have had to create the painting essentially from memory.

=== Menzel's motivation ===
Menzel's motives in creating the painting are highly controversial. The question is whether or to what extent he intended a political message. Peter Paret does not attribute any political significance to the Laying out of the March Fallen as intended by Menzel. Rather, the painting is a "work of conspicuous impartiality". Comparisons with written descriptions of the event would suggest that Menzel captured the moment exactly as it actually happened. With believes that Menzel was striving for a compromise solution between the reality of the event he witnessed and a political message. In his attempt to approximate reality, With refers to several similarities between the pencil drawing and the later painting. In the pencil drawing, for example, the majority of the people are already in the foreground. The picture detail also corresponds to that of the painting. At the same time, however, the painting was also created as a political message. Menzel's intention was to criticize the rule of Frederick William IV. The coffins are a reminder of the bloody escalation caused by the king. The various social groups depicted were intended to express a revolutionary unity. Claude Keisch also partially agrees with this assessment. However, the art historian considers the "utopia of social harmony" to be more central than concrete democratic ideals. ideals: significantly, the painting does not show the scene in which the Prussian monarch paid his respects to the March martyrs from the balcony of the Berlin City Palace, but rather the presence of all social groups during the laying out of the coffin on the Gendarmenmarkt.

For Werner Busch, the realistic depiction of the painting speaks against interpreting it as a "political confessional painting". Rather, Menzel tried to capture the "conflicting impulses [of ...] order and disorder" of a gathered crowd: Individual groups of people are recognizable, but do not form clear units. The area of the black coffins in front of the German Cathedral, on the other hand, is an element of order. It accentuates the horizontal central axis of the painting.

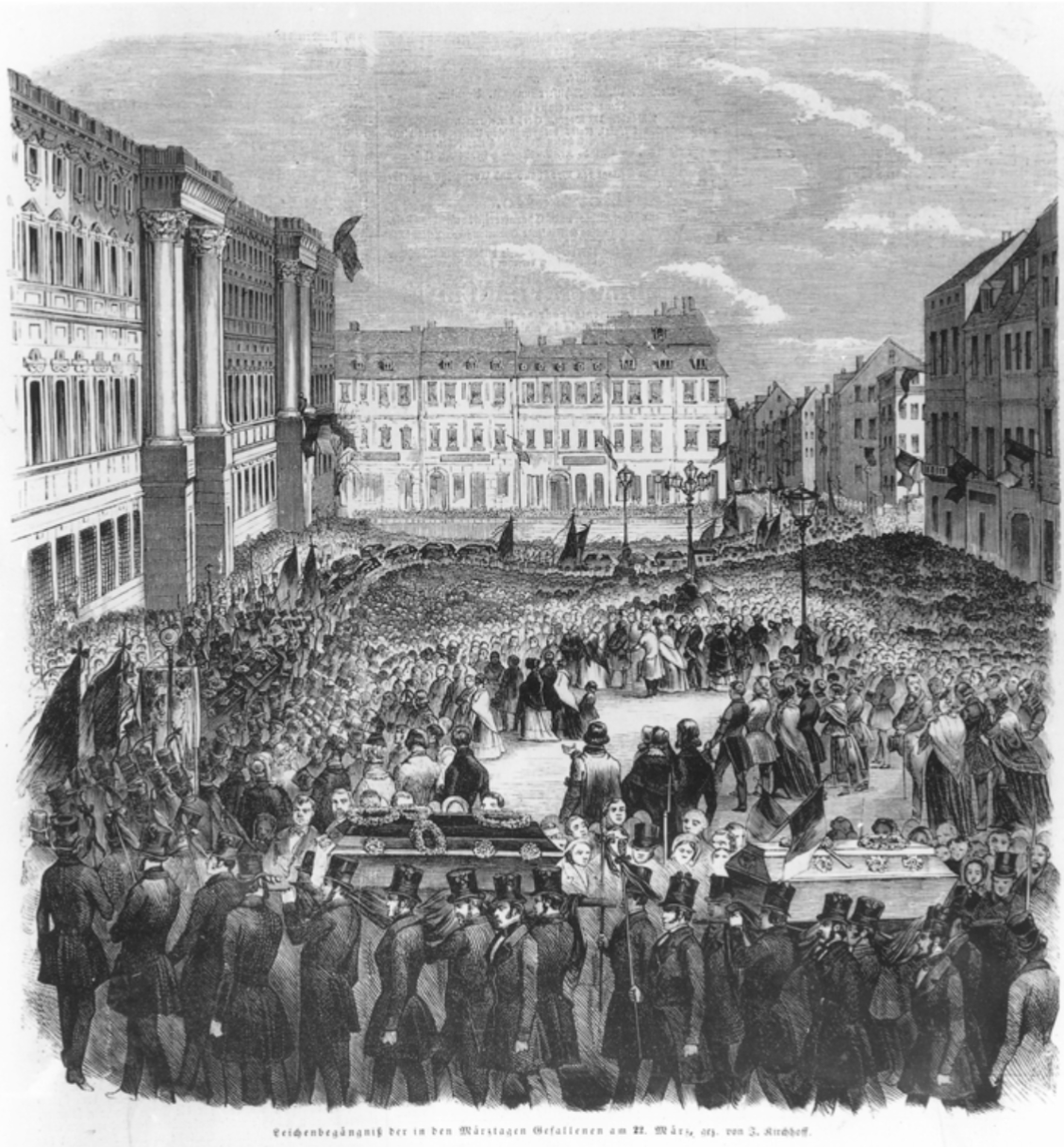
Johann Jakob Kirchhoff, "Leichenbegängniss der in den Märztagen Gefallenen am 22. März", in: Leipziger Illustrirte Zeitung of April 15, 1848

Françoise Forster-Hahn considers Menzel's decision to capture the morning hours shortly before the official ceremony to be an indication of the artist's political indecision. Depicting a time in the morning allowed him to depict a crowd less focused on the coffins or the revolution. In comparison, according to Françoise Forster-Hahn, a drawing of the funeral procession by Johann Jakob Kirchhoff in the Leipzig Illustrirte Zeitung of April 15, 1848, evokes a united front of those gathered.

=== Possible work stoppage ===
The uncolored lower left corner of the painting is usually interpreted by researchers as an indication that Menzel broke off work on the painting. It is debated above all whether political disappointment or aesthetic reasons were responsible for this. According to With, Menzel had initially expected that the victory achieved together on the barricades would bring about a future rapprochement between the nobility, bourgeoisie and proletariat. In view of the further course of the revolution, however, this hope proved to be an illusion by September 1848 at the latest. Françoise Forster-Hahn also associates the cessation of work with political acrimony, as the Gendarmenmarkt depicted here had already become a scene for the looming end of the revolution in November 1848: General Wrangel occupied the square, and the Prussian National Assembly meeting in the Schauspielhaus had to end its sessions in Berlin. In addition, against the background of the political situation, the likelihood of being able to present the painting to the public had decreased.

Paret, on the other hand, sees the faithful visual depiction as the decisive reason why Menzel did not complete the painting: While it is no coincidence that the figures in the middle foreground appear to be behaving rather statically and less communicatively, the actors on the right-hand side of the picture have much more movement and conversation implied. Menzel did not succeed in convincingly reconciling the historically correct contradiction between the "solemn seriousness" and the "great excitement". In addition, the individual design of some of the figures disrupts their integration into a uniform-looking crowd. These aesthetic problems frustrated Menzel and he therefore stopped working on the painting. According to Busch, Menzel did not end his work on the painting out of political disappointment: The Laying out of the March Fallen hung in Menzel's studio after all. His paintings Balcony Room and Bedroom, used for private use, also remained in a similar state. As oil sketches that were little recognized by the public, the chances of selling them seemed slim. The American art historian Michael Fried believes that Menzel abandoned the work as he may have been dissatisfied with the blurred, blotchy depiction of the 183 coffins. As a result, the painting did not do justice to the many individual fates of the March martyrs. It is also unclear exactly when the painting was signed or abandoned. According to Detlef Hofmann, the signature could have been created in 1848, as it gives a specific date ("Ad. Menzel 1848"). Fried disagrees with this interpretation, as it is not clear when Menzel actually applied the signature.

The opinion that the painting is incomplete has not gone unchallenged in research: The Austrian art historian Karin Gludovatz sees the use of an artist's signature as evidence that the painting was completed. Signatures were only customary for completed paintings. Menzel deliberately left the production process visible in order to draw attention to the subjective construction character of his painting. It does not show reality, but merely his perception and artistic processing of the event. Werner Busch argues that although the signature should certainly emphasize a sense of completion, its placement on the unfinished edge should at the same time identify the picture as a work that is not complete.

== Provenance and Menzel's view on the painting ==
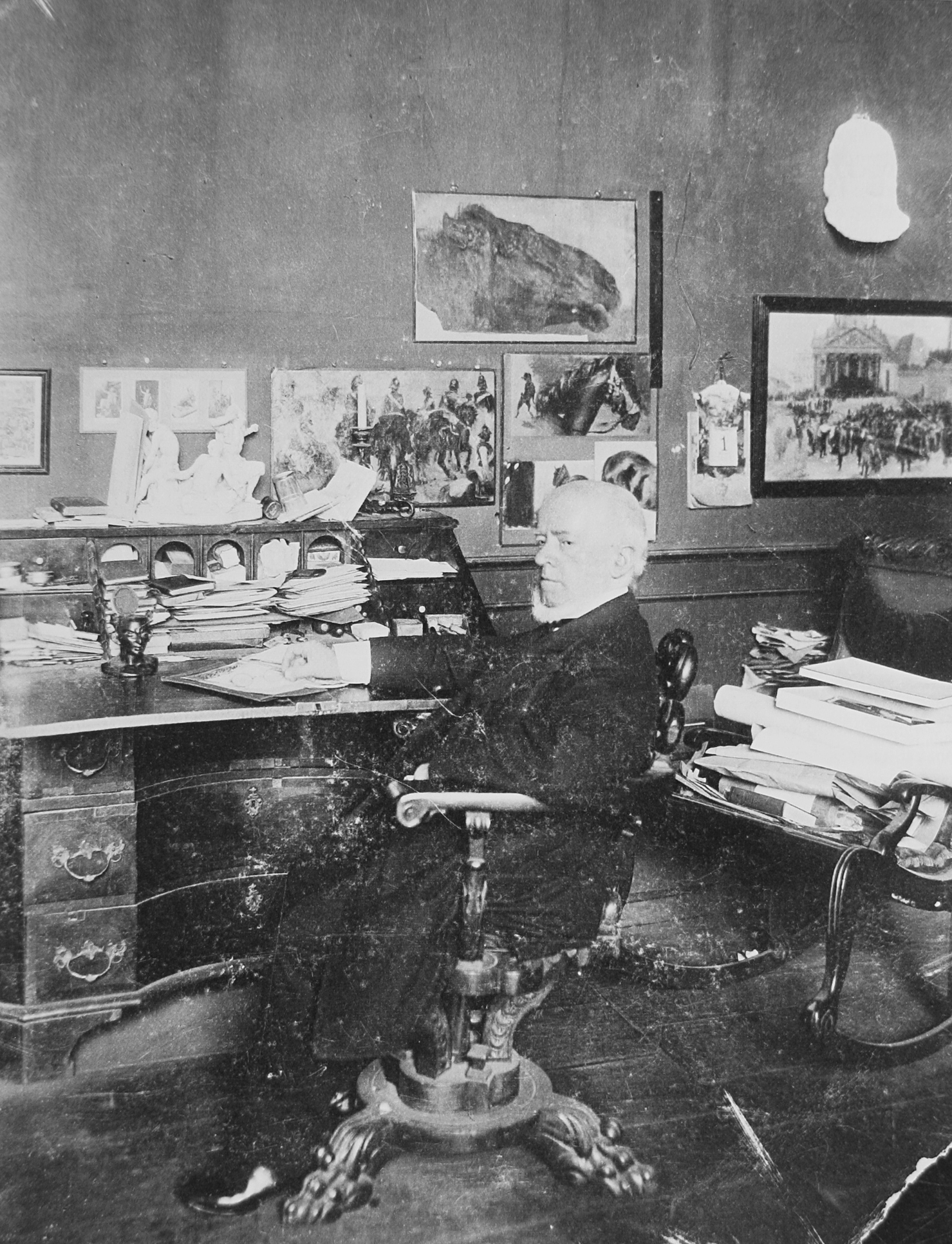
The photograph, taken between 1890 and 1900, shows Menzel in his studio. The painting Laying in State of the March Fallen hangs on the wall to the right of several horse studies. Unknown photographer, Staatliche Museen Berlin, Zentralarchiv

The Laying in State of the March Fallen initially remained in the artist's studio, where only a few guests, such as the painter Alexander von Ungern-Sternberg, saw it. Consequently, unlike Eugène Delacroix's Liberty Leads the People, the painting played no role in public perception. The exact location of the painting in Menzel's studio can be precisely reconstructed thanks to a photograph, among other things. It hung near a door, to the left of which several horse studies were lined up. As is suspected, they also refer in part to the revolution of 1848: Menzel used severed horse heads from a Berlin slaughterhouse as a model in April 1848. The studies thus thematize bodies that have been violently killed, just like the funeral painting. In Menzel's studio, to the right of the Laying out of the March Fallen, was his sketch Frederick the Great in Lissa: Bonsoir, Messieurs!

On the occasion of Menzel's 80th birthday in 1895, the Akademie der Künste in Berlin exhibited the painting for the first time. This was followed in 1896 by a presentation in the Menzel exhibition at the Hamburger Kunsthalle. Shortly before the turn of the century, the painting was purchased for a Swiss private collection. The buyer was the silk manufacturer and art lover Gustav Henneberg, who set up his own gallery in Zurich in 1897. He was interested in several of Menzel's major works, including the Laying out of the March Fallen and Frederick the Great in Lissa: Bonsoir, Messieurs.

In 1902, the director of the Kunsthalle, Alfred Lichtwark, succeeded in incorporating the painting into the Hamburg collection. The director also had the opportunity to ask the painter about the painting. He replied that he "had gone to work with a beating heart and great enthusiasm for the ideas in whose service the victims [had] fallen, but before it was finished, he would have seen that it was all a lie or stupid stuff. Thereupon he would have placed the picture with his face against the wall and in his disgust would not have laid another hand on it.

Menzel's distancing from the painting is critically questioned by art historians such as Helmut Börsch-Supan: after all, the interview took place 54 years after the painting was created. At that time, Emperor Wilhelm II had already made the artist a Knight of the Order of the Black Eagle. In the upper circles of imperial Berlin, he enjoyed a reputation that he would have jeopardized if he had been too openly committed to the revolution of 1848. The photograph of Menzel's studio in Berlin's Sigismundstraße, which shows the painting hanging on the wall, also speaks against Menzel's aversion to his painting. Keisch sees Menzel's commentary as a rejection of further social unrest: in view of events such as the Berlin Armory Storm of June 14, 1848, Menzel had reconsidered his position on the revolution. As evidence, he cites a letter by Menzel from September 1848, in which he assessed the current political developments: "To the (just) indignation about the top has now come only indignation about the bottom". Fried also believes that Menzel, "as a typical liberal, felt above all connected to the bourgeoisie and turned away from the revolution in view of the workers' willingness to use violence".

== Classification ==
=== Significance for Menzel's work ===
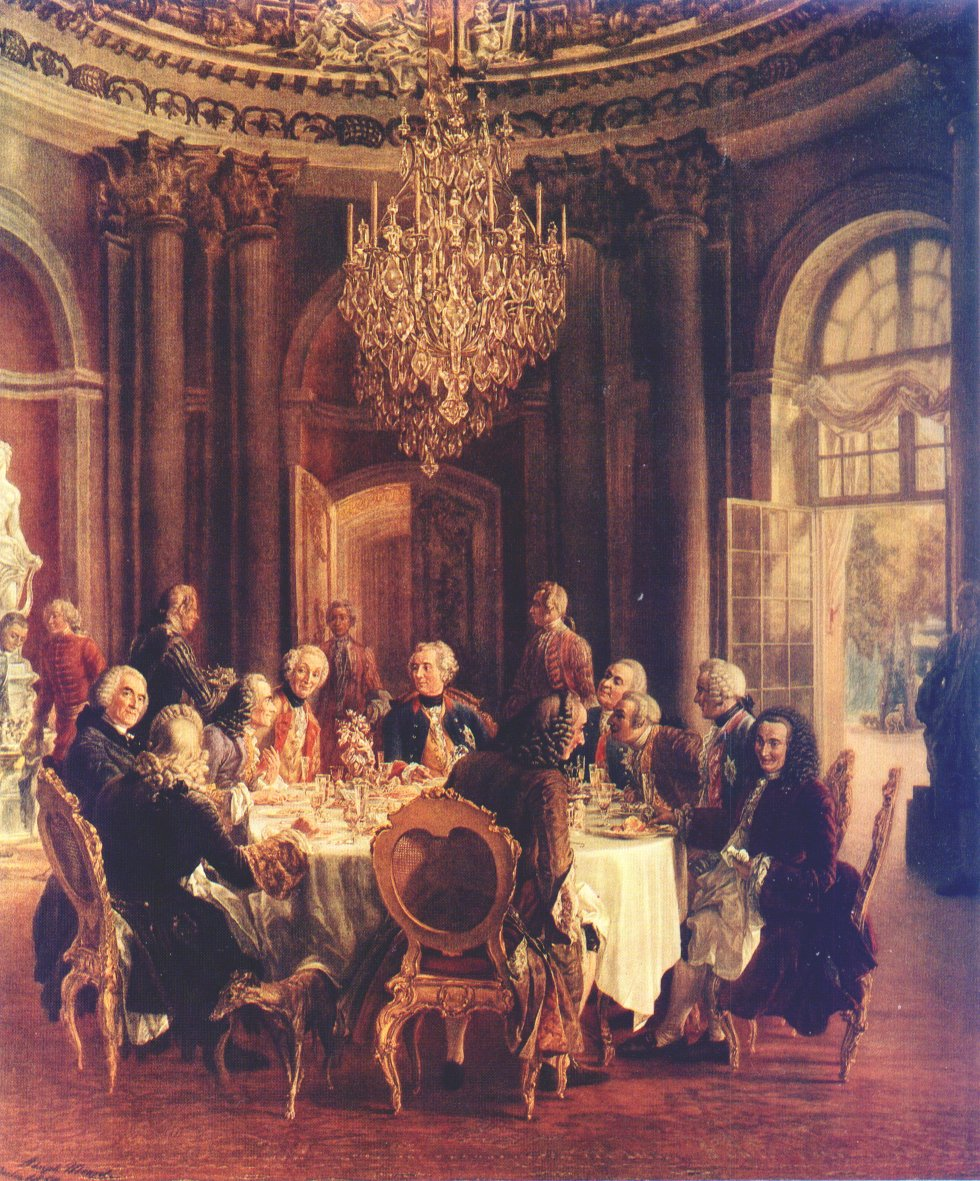
Tafelrunde in Sanssouci, 1850

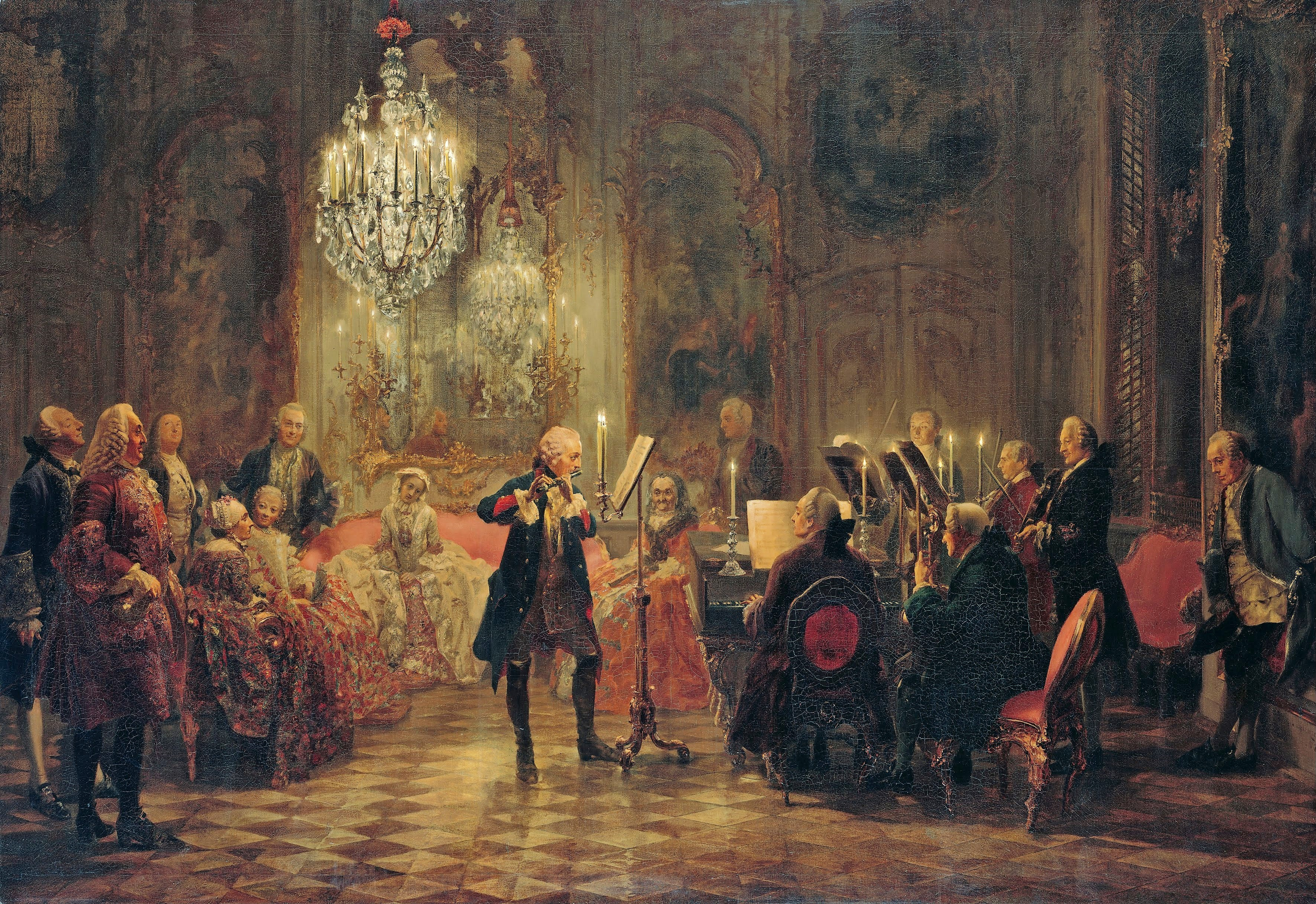
Flötenkonzert Friedrichs des Großen in Sanssouci, 1852

After his work on the Laying out of the March Fallen, Menzel turned his attention back to Frederick the Great and began preparatory work on the paintings Round Table at Sanssouci and Frederick the Great Playing the Flute at Sanssouci. The exact reasons for this shift in interests are the subject of debate among researchers. According to the art historian Gisold Lammel, Menzel wanted to see the long-dead Prussian ruler as a monarch who had accommodated the wishes of the people. A reformation of the state order initiated by the people, on the other hand, became more unrealistic. The art historian Hubertus Kohle comes to a similar conclusion. Menzel regarded King Frederick William IV, who as monarch was responsible for the escalation of violence in March 1848, as a weak ruler and consequently contrasted this with the ideal of the heroic king of the Enlightenment era. At the same time, he also emphasizes continuities: The "Laying in State of the March Fallen" should be understood as an "anticipation of the peculiarities of the Friedrich paintings", as the laying in state painting already represents "a rather marginal, not very fruitful moment". It is not the dramatic climax of the event itself that is thematized, but the events before or after.

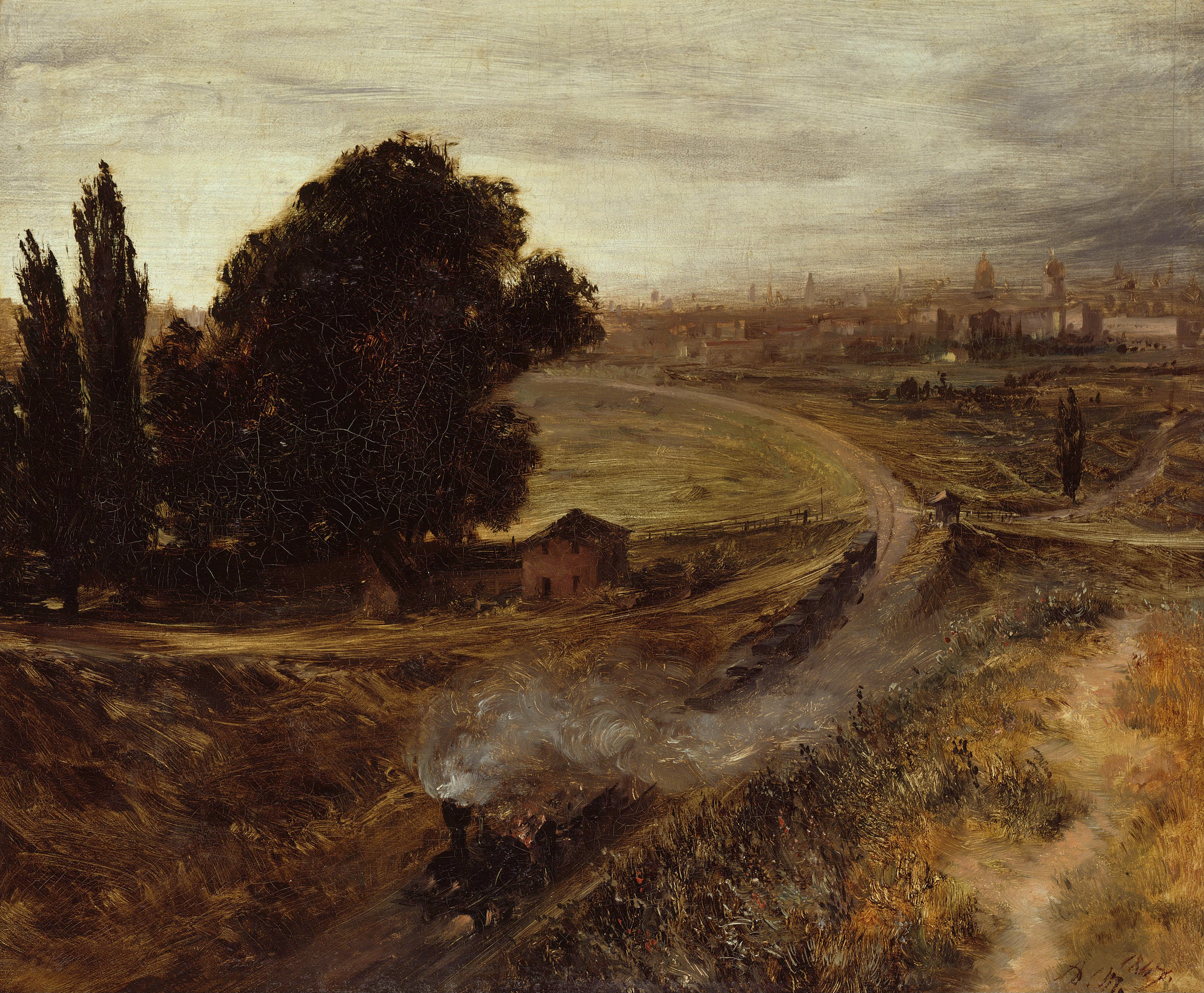
Die Berlin-Potsdamer Bahn, 1847

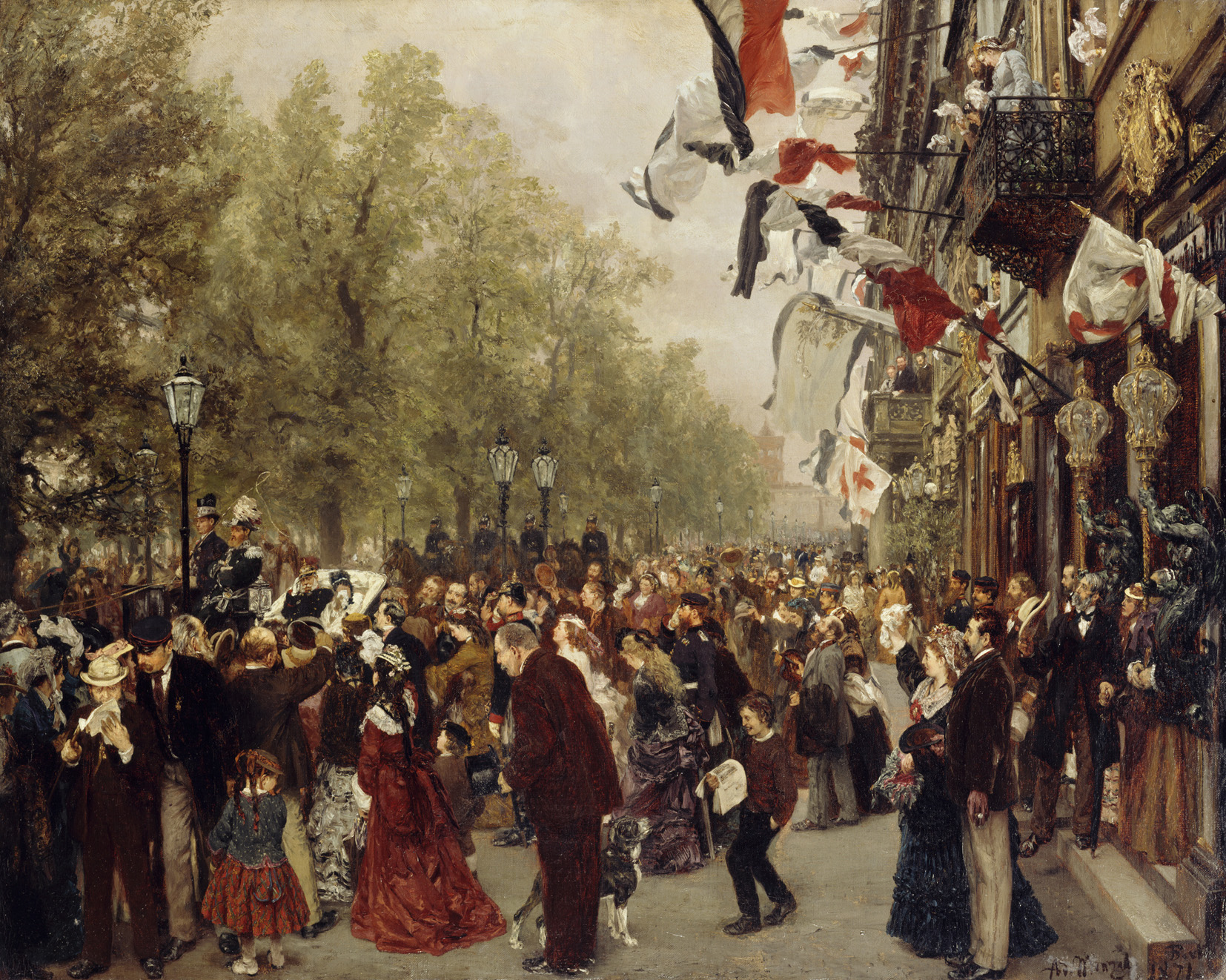
Abreise König Wilhelms I. zur Armee am 31. Juli 1870, 1871

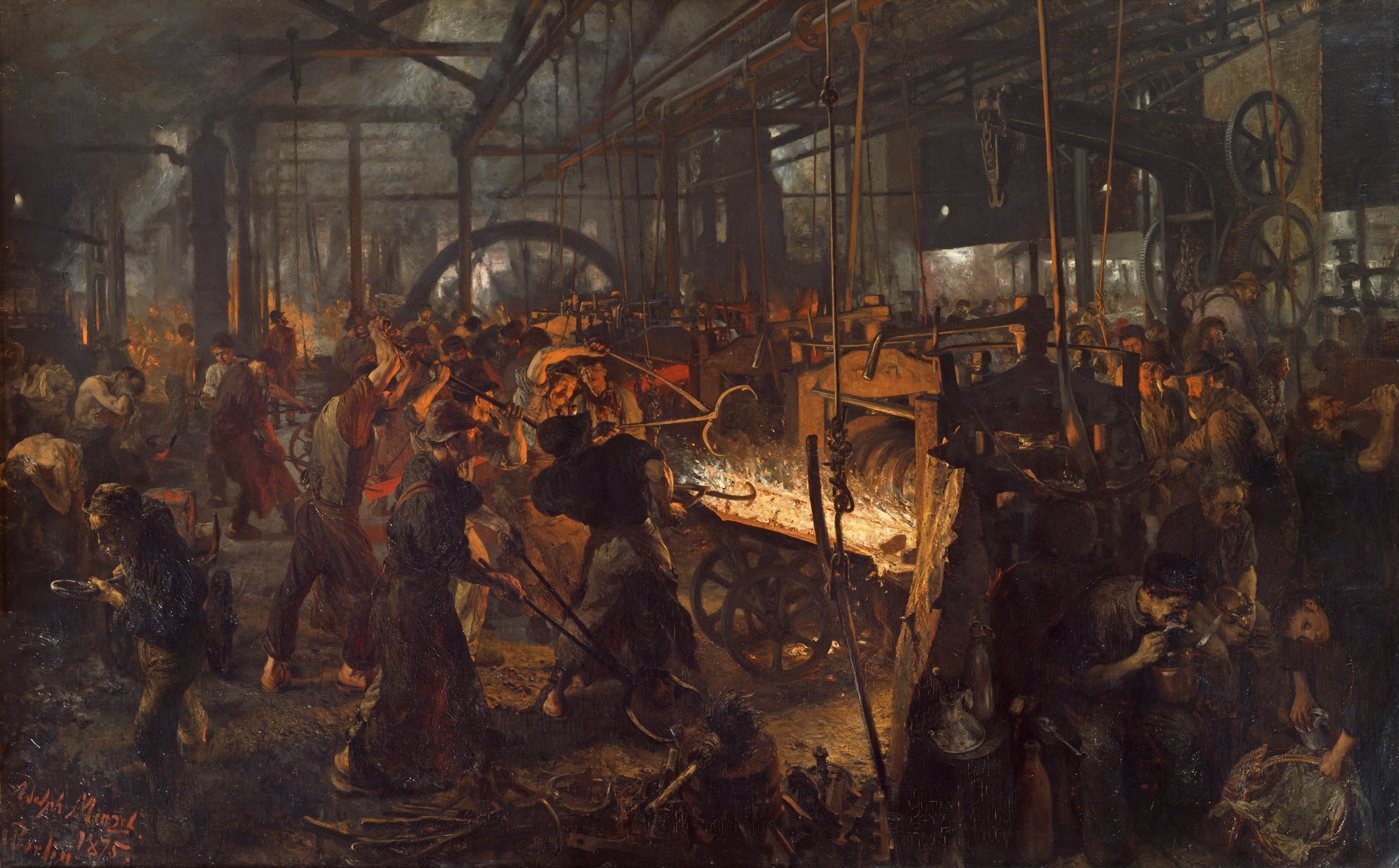
Eisenwalzwerk, 1875

The Laying out of the March Fallen was Menzel's first contribution to a history painting of the present. His Berlin-Potsdam Railway from 1847, The Departure of Wilhelm I from Berlin in July 1870 and the Iron Rolling Mill from 1875 can also be assigned to contemporary themes. These pictures refer either to modern urban spaces or sections of society. Some of them – like the Laying out of the March Fallen – deal with urban crowds that negate structures of order and social hierarchies. In Keisch's opinion, Menzel was able to further develop this depiction in the March Fallen for around 50 years. For example, in the painting Departure of King Wilhelm I to the Army on July 31, 1870, the Prussian monarch is lost in the crowd and does not appear as the main figure. The Laying out of the March Fallen is also significant for Menzel's work for another reason: this was the first time Menzel tried out a view in which the foreground figures are seen simultaneously from close up and from an elevated position. As a result, he had to take into account a distortion of perspective and depict the bodies foreshortened from top to bottom. The heads of the foreground figures therefore appear to be further forward than the feet. This gives the impression that the foreground figures want to move away from the square and strive out of the picture into the viewer's space.

=== Opposition to the historical image ===
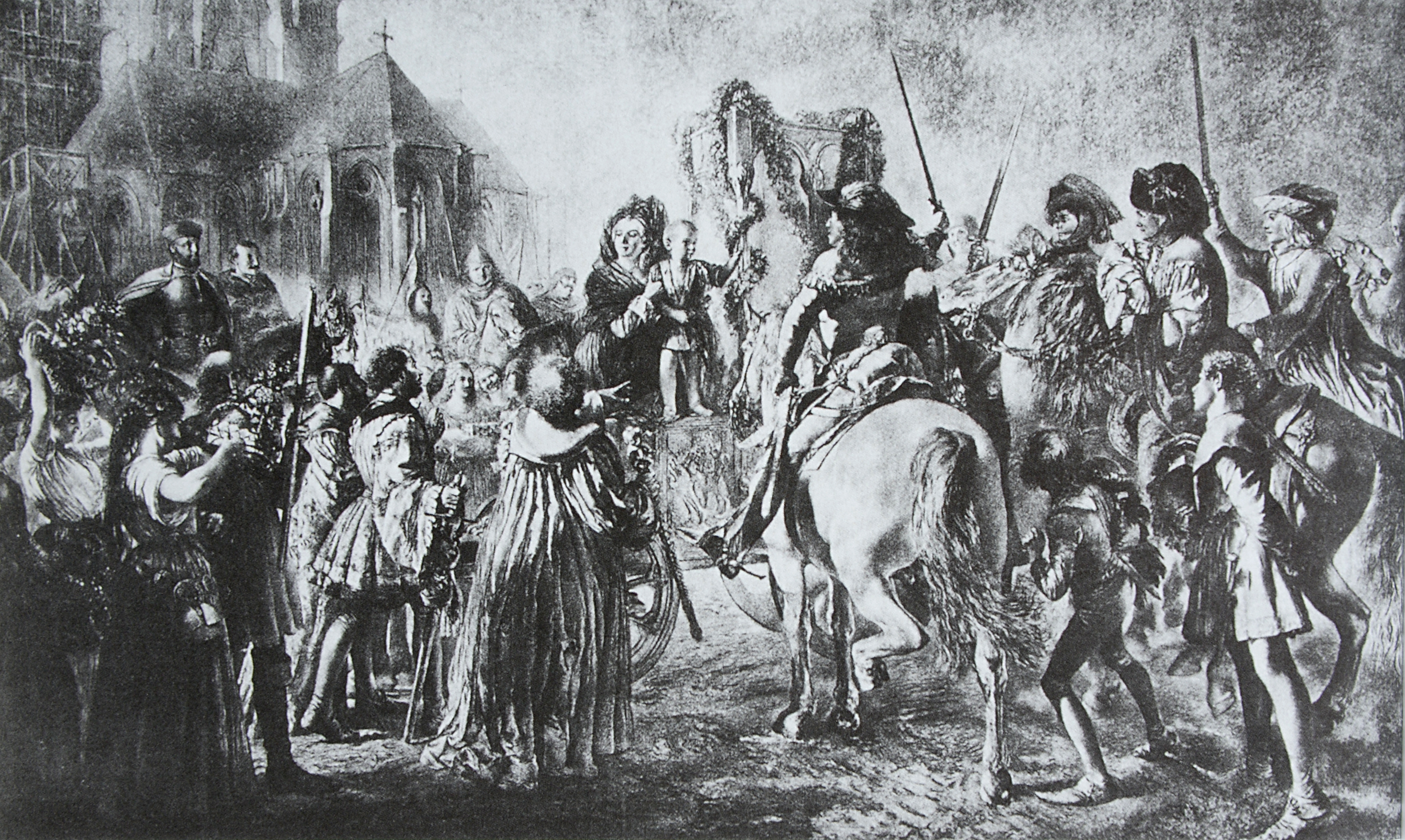
Adolph Menzel's Kassel cartoon. The entry of Sophie of Brabant into Marburg with her son Henry, later Landgrave of Hesse, in 1248, 1847/1848, chalk and charcoal, formerly exhibited in the Kaiser-Friedrich-Museum in Magdeburg, destroyed during the war in 1945

It is difficult to classify the Laying out of the March Fallen as a genre. According to Karin Gludovatz, the painting cannot be attributed to history painting because it does not take a clear position on the historical event. The Laying in State of the March Fallen could be interpreted on the one hand as an expression of homage to the insurgents. On the other hand, the painting refrains from glorifying the battle. It also differs from other revolutionary paintings in that it focuses on the victims and thus does not support a narrative of national identity. The Laying out of the March Fallen was not Menzel's first history painting that subverted the traditional academic rules. The so-called Kassel Cardboard was painted in Kassel as early as 1847/1848 and depicts the entry of Duchess of Brabant into Marburg. However, the central figure in the scene, the founder of the Hesse dynasty, does not stand out from the assembled crowd. The narrative of a hero, which is characteristic of history paintings, is disrupted in this way.

According to Susanne von Falkenhausen, there is neither a clearly identifiable main plot nor a main character in the funeral painting. In the compositional center – where the central figure usually appears – there is a deserted area of floor. The coffin being carried there seems to disappear into the distance as far as the German Cathedral. The American art historian Albert Boime sees the empty space as a means by which Menzel constructs a contrast between the crowd and the main action – the laid-out coffins. Even the movements indicated in the painting do not all refer to the coffins, but are intended to create the impression of a reality that appears random. The German art historian Detlef Hoffmann arrives at a similar assessment of the picture: Menzel wanted to illustrate with his photographic-like depiction of many, even unimportant details – which distract from the main event – "how even great historical moments dissolve into coincidences". This was entirely in the spirit of Realist painting.

=== Meaning as a revolutionary image ===
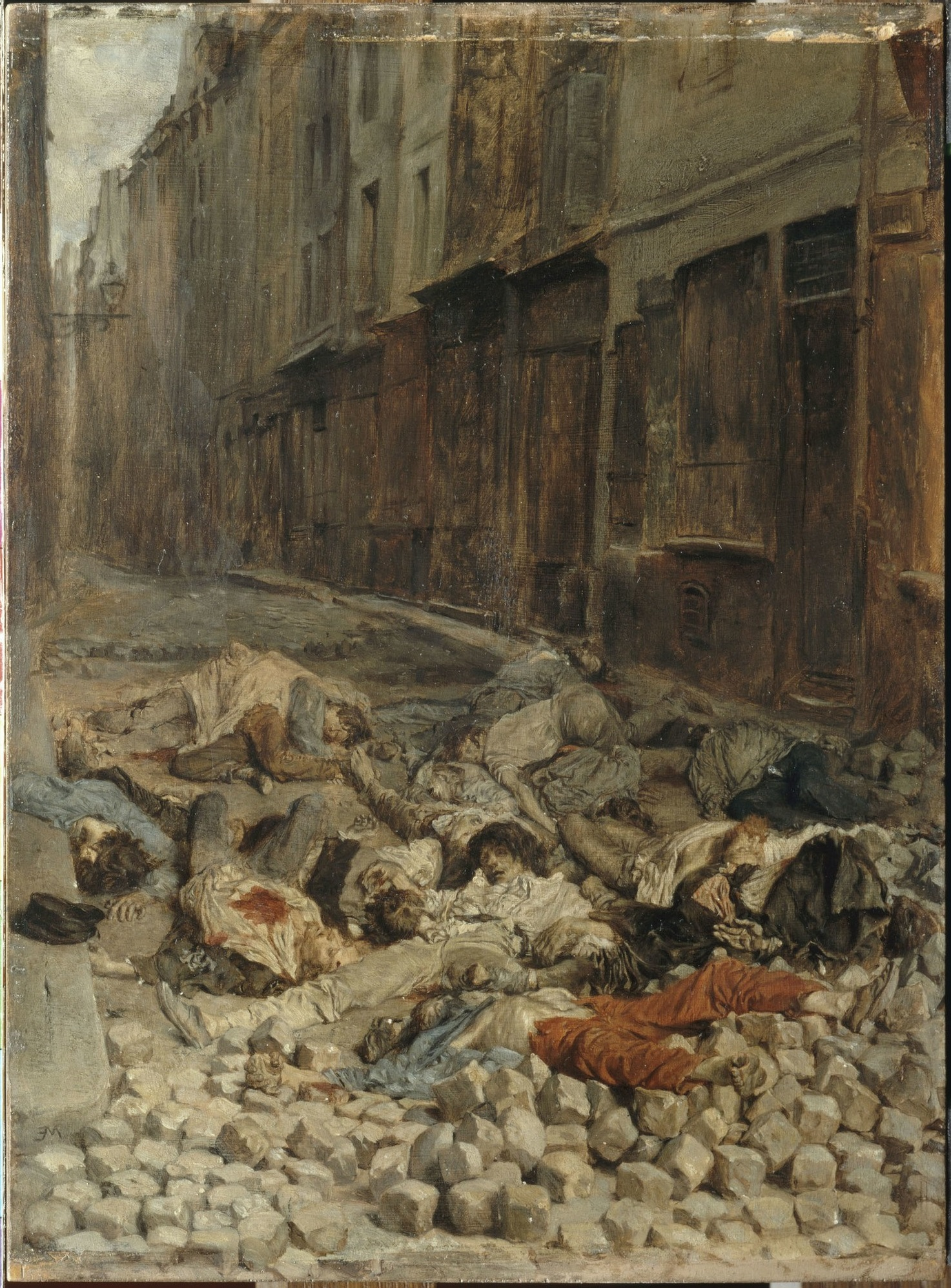
Ernest Meissoniers Barrikade in der Rue de la Mortellerie, um 1850

Jacques-Louis Davids Schwur im Ballhaus, 1791

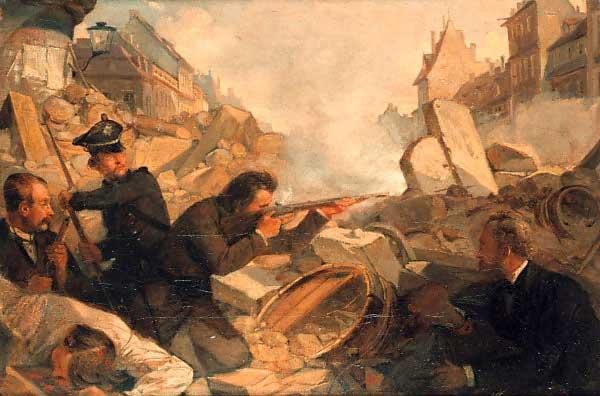
Julius Scholtzs Barrikadenkampf im Mai 1849, 1849

Jost Hermand classifies the Laying out of the March Fallen as the "most important picture of the German Revolution of 1848". It is a picture that, in the spirit of realist painting, captures what Menzel actually saw as an eyewitness to the event. The painting is characterized "less by hope for a possible victory [of the revolution] than by mourning for what was lost". In Jost Hermand's opinion, the unfinished state of the painting made it a "stirring memorial". It calls for the still failed revolution of 1848 to be realized more successfully in the future. Verena Hein considers the radically unembellished "contemporary witness" formulated in the painting to be unique in Germany and characteristic of Menzel alone. Such a phenomenon can otherwise be observed above all in French painters such as Ernest Meissonier. However, his Barricade in the Rue de la Mortellerie depicts the civilians killed during the revolution much more ruthlessly than Menzel. The Laying out of the March dead shows no corpses. The coffins are closed. According to the art historian Claude Keisch, Menzel obscures a political position in this way. Wolfgang Kemp sees the revolutionary image as "characteristic of German conditions". According to Kemp, the crowd is subdued by the mourning ritual and does not appear as a protagonist.

Apart from the Laying out of the March Fallen, there are only a few paintings by important German artists that refer to the revolution of 1848. These include, for example, the Dance of Death by Alfred Rethel and the Barricade Fight in May 1849 by Julius Scholtz. Werner Busch compares Aufbahrung der Märzgefallenen with Schwur im Ballhaus by Jacques-Louis David. Like Menzel's painting, the work thematizes an event that had occurred not long before it was created. It depicts a moment of the French Revolution: The deputies of the Third Estate vow in the Ballhaus of Versailles not to disperse until they have given France a constitution. David never completed the painting, as many of the personalities in the picture fell victim to the guillotine shortly afterwards. Due to the changed political circumstances, the subject seemed to have lost its relevance and appropriateness. According to Busch, the same applied to Menzel's Laying in State of the March Fallen. It was only after a long time had passed since the events that both David's and Menzel's revolutionary paintings regained their original historical significance.

The Laying out of the March Fallen was overshadowed by Menzel's Frederick paintings, especially during the German Empire. While the 18th century Prussian king was reinterpreted as a pioneer of the German nation state and Menzel's royal paintings became correspondingly popular, the memory of the revolution of 1848 seemed to fade. It was only after, World War II that interest in the painting increased. On the one hand, this was due to the political rehabilitation of the 1848 revolution as a theme. On the other hand, the picture fitted in with the trend towards a new style of realism that emerged in the 1970s. The funeral painting now plays a key role in the collective memory of the funeral ceremony on March 22, 1848. The American historian Peter Paret believes that without Menzel's painting, "the community-building, political and human aspects of the ceremony" would be underestimated today. The Laying out of the March Fallen inspired the Leipzig painter Bernhard Heisig to create several drawings and lithographs of the same name in 1953. The DDR-Maler was not inspired by Menzel's original in the Hamburger Kunsthalle, but by a photographic reproduction of the painting. Like Menzel, Heisig also shows the transportation of the coffins to Berlin's Gendarmenmarkt in a pencil drawing. Unlike Menzel's work, however, the crowd is gathered around a single coffin cart. Compared to those in Menzel's painting, the figures shown close up seem to take a greater interest in the fate of the March martyr. The American art historian April Eisman considers the paintings to be a reaction to the Uprising of June 17, 1953 in the German Democratic Republic. Since public mourning for the citizens killed during the protest was forbidden, Heisig had thematized an event that had taken place a long time ago.

The Laying out of the March Fallen also found its way into Schoolbooks and Geschichtsatlanten, where it is often used to illustrate the revolutionary camp. The art historian Andreas Köstler criticized such use. The picture was too politically indeterminate and too unfinished to be suitable as a "depiction [...] of a historical event". Köstler points out, for example, that the figures sitting on the staircase walls of the Schauspielhaus give the impression that there are no more open spaces in the square. In fact, however, the Gendarmenmarkt depicted by Menzel has a large gap in the immediate vicinity of the coffins. For the art historian, Menzel's painting is a "representative image of the Berlin revolutionary attempt that failed due to a lack of determination". Hubertus Kohle came to a similar conclusion: Menzel had captured a social contrast between the bourgeoisie and the "lower classes" in the painting: While the former adopts a solemn demeanor, the latter would debate and gesticulate more animatedly with each other. This disagreement also contributed decisively to the failure of the revolution.

=== Interpretation of individual figures ===
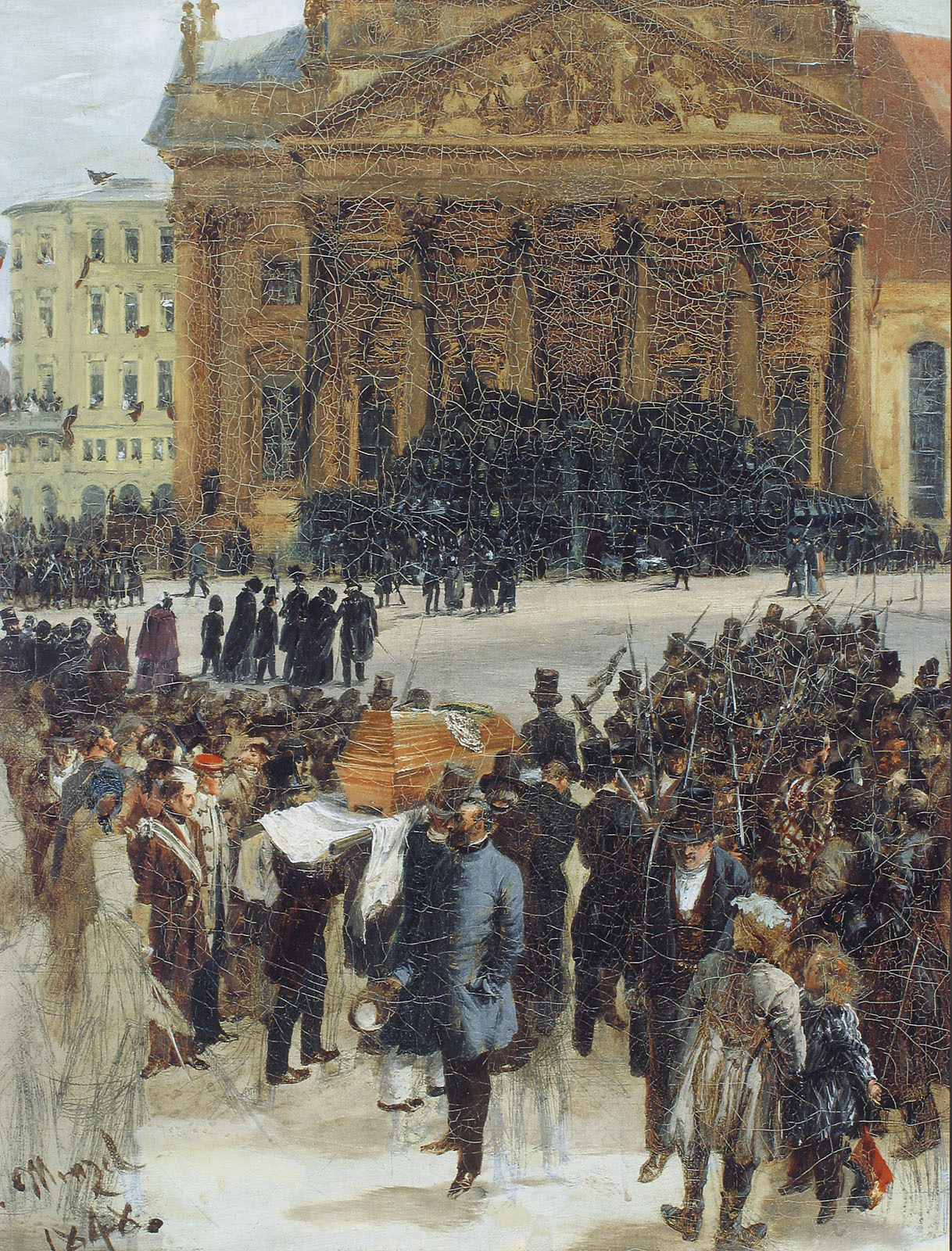
The scene of the gentleman taking to his heels (central foreground), detail from the laying out of the March dead

In research, the social affiliation of the figure standing in front of the coffin and pulling off his hat is disputed. With considers her to be a representative of the nobility and a supporter of the Prussian king. Paret, on the other hand, classifies her as an "educated and economically saturated person". He was a supporter of the barricade struggle and a liberal-minded citizen. Gludovatz also agrees with this. The figure should be seen as a representative of the bourgeoisie. In her opinion, the figure shows an ambivalent attitude towards the revolution, just like the bourgeoisie. On the one hand, the pulling of the hat could be interpreted as a sign of greeting to the vigilante. This would express political approval. On the other hand, the scene is reminiscent of the Prussian king. Frederick William IV himself was forced to bare his head in front of the coffins of the March martyrs carried into the courtyard of the Berlin City Palace under pressure from the assembled crowd. With this gesture, the monarch paid homage to the revolutionaries in a similar way to the aforementioned figure in Menzel's painting. However, this act was not done out of conviction. Menzel thus leaves the figure standing half-heartedly turned away from the actual action. At the same time, the gentleman leaves his left hand in his pocket, which Paret interprets as disrespect: Menzel may have alluded to the figure's actual dismissive attitude. Boime sees the figure as an officer taking part in the ceremony in civilian dress. The art historian bases his attribution on the figure's military-aristocratic posture and strikingly elegant clothing. It appears to be turning in exactly the opposite direction to the coffin, which is being carried towards the German Cathedral. The diagonal axis emphasized by the coffin or the March Fallen is thus disturbed by the figure.

Gludovatz believes that Menzel also positioned himself in the picture. On the one hand, his signature touches the mourning women. On the other hand, the raised hat of the particularly elegantly dressed figure seems to pay respect to the vigilante soldier and the signature. The homage to the armed citizen thus also seems to be in Menzel's spirit. Busch considers the upper figure standing on the stairs of the theater to be central. The vigilantes deny her access to the coffins. This means that she – like Menzel as a historical witness to the event – only has the option of observing. The figure remains excluded from the actual events in the picture.

== Literature ==
- Werner Busch: Adolph Menzel, Leben und Werk, Beck, München 2004, ISBN 978-3-406-52191-1, p. 85–91.
- Susanne von Falkenhausen: "Zeitzeuge der Leere. Zum Scheitern nationaler Bildformeln bei Menzel", in: Claude Keisch/Marie Ursula Riemann-Reyher (Hrsg.), Ausstellungskatalog Adolph Menzel. 1815–1905, das Labyrinth der Wirklichkeit, Berlin 1996, ISBN 978-3-7701-3704-6, p. 494–502.
- Françoise Forster-Hahn: "Die Aufbahrung der Märzgefallenen". Menzel’s Unfinished Painting as a Parable of the Aborted Revolution of 1848. In: Christian Beutler, Peter-Klaus Schuster, Martin Warnke (Ed): Kunst um 1800 und die Folgen. Prestel, München 1988, ISBN 978-3-7913-0903-3, p. 221–232 (english).
- Karin Gludovatz: Nicht zu übersehen. Der Künstler als Figur der Peripherie in Adolph Menzels "Aufbahrung der Märzgefallenen in Berlin" (1848). In: Edith Futscher u. a. (Hrsg.): Was aus dem Bild gefällt. Figuren des Details in Kunst und Literatur. München u. a. 2007, ISBN 978-3-7705-4347-2, p. 237–263.
- Françoise Forster-Hahn: Das unfertige Bild und sein fehlendes Publikum. Adolph Menzels "Aufbahrung der Märzgefallenen" als visuelle Verdichtung politischen Wandels. In: Uwe Fleckner (Ed.): Bilder machen Geschichte: Historische Ereignisse im Gedächtnis der Kunst. De Gruyter, Berlin 2014, ISBN 978-3-05-006317-1, p. 267–279.
- Christopher B. With: Adolph von Menzel and the German Revolution of 1848. In: Zeitschrift für Kunstgeschichte 24 (1979), p. 195–215.
