= Lee Reynolds =

Lee Reynolds may refer to:

- Lee Reynolds (theatre producer)
- Lee Reynolds (commissioner)
- Lee Reynolds, a member of American doo-wop group The Fireflies
- Lee Reynolds, a member of British punk rock band The Destructors
- Lee Reynolds, a member of American thrash metal band Morbid Saint
- Lee Reynolds, a member of British indie rock band Mesh-29
- Lee Reynolds, screenwriter for such films as Delta Force 2
- Lee Reynolds, actor who played Captain Tugg, host of a children's cartoon show broadcast in the early 1960s
- Lee Reynolds, midfielder for Rhydymwyn F.C.
- Lee Reynolds, real name of British/Filipino disc jockey DJ eL Reynolds
