= Mesh (disambiguation) =

Mesh is a type of physical material distinguished by connected and crossing strands

Mesh or MESH may also refer to:

== In science ==
- Mesh (scale), a measurement scale for small particles
- Abbreviated structural formula of the chemical methanethiol (MeSH)
- Number sign
- An elemental electrical circuit loop, used in mesh analysis

== In computing and mathematics ==
- A description of an object by a collection of small simple shapes, commonly used in numerical simulations and computer graphics
  - Types of mesh in computational mathematics
    - Polygon mesh, a partition into polygons
    - Mesh (mathematics), a partition of an interval
  - Mesh generation or "grid generation" or "meshing," algorithms and software for creating meshes
- Mesh network, a highly interconnected network of computers or networking hardware
- Data mesh, a decentralized data architecture
- Windows Live Mesh, free synchronization and Remote Desktop software from Microsoft
- "Macintosh Enhanced SCSI Hardware" (MESH), the Power Macintosh MESH SCSI controller
- MESH (cipher), an encryption algorithm
- Mesh Computers, a British computer manufacturer
- Bluetooth mesh, networking standard by Bluetooth SIG

== In popular culture ==
- Mesh (band), a British synthpop band
- Modern Day Zero, a St. Louis rock band previously known as Mesh and Mesh STL
- Mesh-29, an English rock band originally named Mesh
- Meshes (EP), an EP by Pram

== In medicine ==
- Surgical mesh, used to support and repair organs and tissues during surgery
- MeSH, an acronym for Medical Subject Headings

== Food ==
- Mish, a traditional Egyptian cheese that is made by fermenting salty cheese for several months or years

== Other ==
- M.E.S.H., a 1966-formed consortium of European missile manufacturers - Matra, ERNO, Saab AB and Hawker Siddeley Dynamics

== See also ==
- Grid (disambiguation)
- Lattice (disambiguation)
- Mash (disambiguation)
