= Lattice =

Lattice may refer to:

== Arts and design ==
- Latticework, an ornamental criss-crossed framework, an arrangement of crossing laths or other thin strips of material
- Lattice (music), an organized grid model of pitch ratios
- Lattice (pastry), an ornamental pattern of crossing strips of pastry

== Companies ==
- Lattice Engines, a technology company specializing in business applications for marketing and sales
- Lattice Group, a former British gas transmission business
- Lattice Semiconductor, a US-based integrated circuit manufacturer

== Science, technology, and mathematics ==
=== Mathematics ===
- Lattice (group), a repeating arrangement of points
  - Lattice (discrete subgroup), a discrete subgroup of a topological group whose quotient carries an invariant finite Borel measure
  - Lattice (module), a module over a ring that is embedded in a vector space over a field
  - Lattice graph, a graph that can be drawn within a repeating arrangement of points
  - Lattice-based cryptography, encryption systems based on repeating arrangements of points
- Lattice (order), a partially ordered set with unique least upper bounds and greatest lower bounds
  - Lattice-based access control, computer security systems based on partially ordered access privileges
  - Skew lattice, a non-commutative generalization of order-theoretic lattices
- Lattice multiplication, a multiplication algorithm suitable for hand calculation

=== Other uses in science and technology ===
- Bethe lattice, a regular infinite tree structure used in statistical mechanics
- Bravais lattice, a repetitive arrangement of atoms
- Lattice C, a compiler for the C programming language
- Lattice mast, a type of observation mast common on major warships in the early 20th century
- Lattice model (physics), a model defined not on a continuum, but on a grid
- Lattice tower, or truss tower is a type of freestanding framework tower
- Lattice truss bridge, a type of truss bridge that uses many closely spaced diagonal elements

== Other uses ==
- Lattice model (finance), a method for evaluating stock options that divides time into discrete intervals
- Anduril Lattice, a military software platform developed by the American defence technology company Anduril Industries
- Lattice (Centuria), member of the Iris Stratum in the Japanese web manga Centuria

== See also ==
- Grid (disambiguation)
- Mesh (disambiguation)
- Trellis (disambiguation)
