= Graticule (disambiguation) =

A graticule is a grid of lines on a map.

Graticule may also refer to:

- Reticle or graticule, a pattern of markings in an optical device to provide measurement references
- The scale on an oscilloscope that serves as reference marks for measuring the displayed trace

== See also ==
- Grid (disambiguation)
