= The Berlin-Potsdam Railway =

Painting by Adolph Menzel

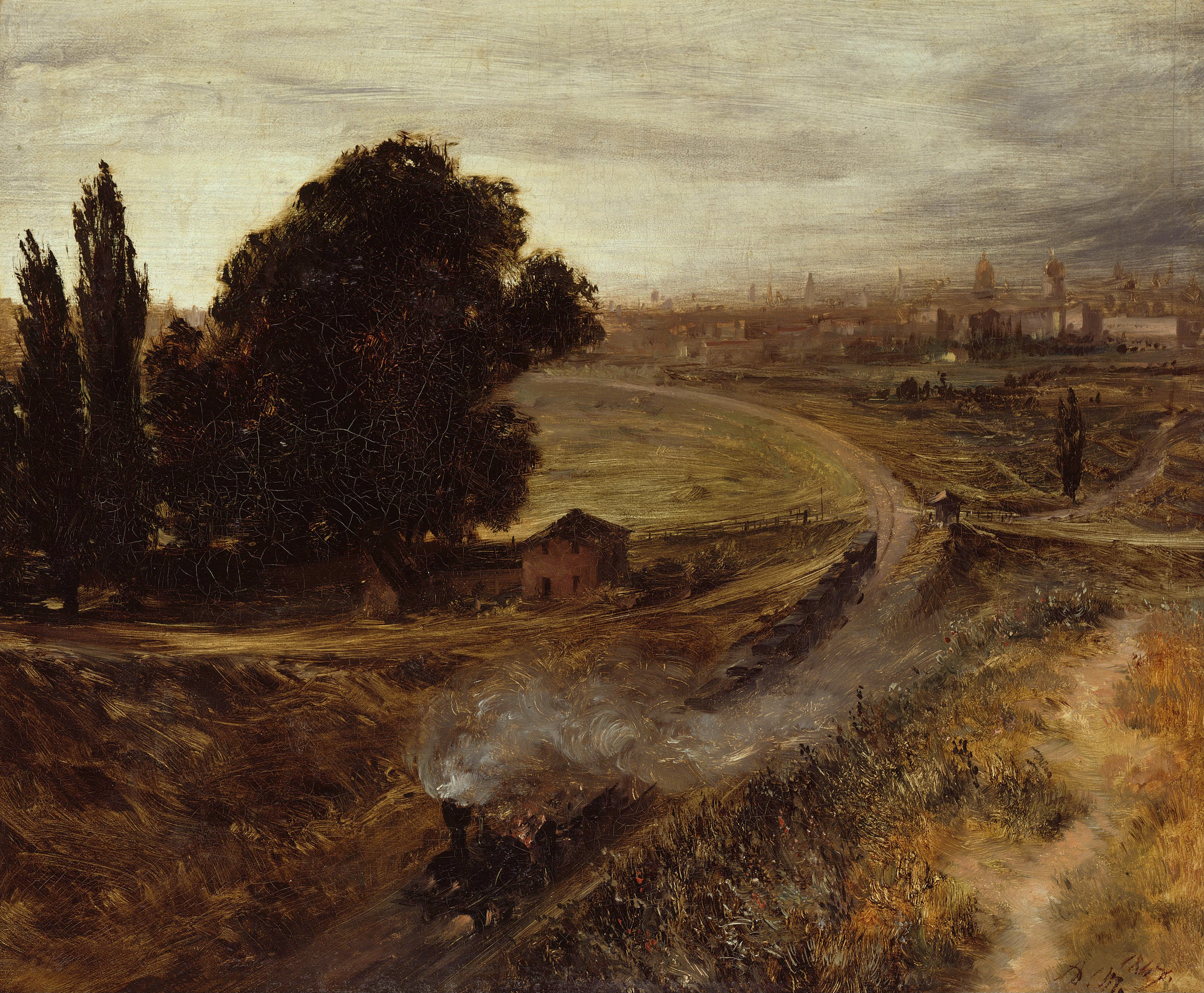
- Artist: Adolph Menzel
- Year: 1847
- Medium: oil on canvas
- Dimensions: 42 cm × 52 cm (17 in × 20 in)
- Location: Alte Nationalgalerie, Berlin

The Berlin-Potsdam Railway is an oil-on-canvas painting by German artist Adolph Menzel, created in 1847. It belongs to the early creative phase of the artist and depicts a section of the Berlin-Potsdam Railway, opened in 1838, at the southwest of the city center of Berlin, in a style that seems to anticipate impressionism. This is the first painting to depict a railway train in the landscape in German painting. The work belongs to the collection of the Alte Nationalgalerie, in Berlin, since 1899.

== Description and analysis ==
Topographically, the painting does not exactly depict the curve to the southwest of the then single-track Berlin-Potsdam railway, the first line in Prussia, near today's Gleisdreieck. The painter's point of view was roughly the elevation near Schöneberger Großgörschenstraße, south of the track. The area was still undeveloped at the time, but was already earmarked for the large expansion of Berlin and looked correspondingly desolate after the abandonment of agricultural and horticultural use. The painting in the middle distance is dominated by a group of dark trees that appears to be extremely large. The silhouette of Berlin city center can be seen on the horizon; the two domes are the German and French cathedrals at the Gendarmenmarkt, but they are only hinted by Menzel's hasty brushwork.

Menzel was the first artist in Germany to recognize this wasteland in front of the city gates of Berlin as a painterly motif at the beginning of industrialization, with its railway as a means of transport and travel. The railway track changed the formerly rural area. The modern technology at the beginning of the industrial revolution has positive connotations for Menzel. Smoke, steam and the speed of the locomotive and its train create an intended atmospheric interaction in Menzel's painting. However, the purely technical aspect takes a back seat in this work in favor of the atmospheric effect. The painting stands in complete contrast to a painting created by Menzel's painter friend Karl Eduard Biermann, in the same year on behalf of the Lokomotivfabrik Borsig.
