= Feuerland =

Designation for the industrial nucleus of Berlin

Coordinates: 52°32′0″N 13°23′0″E

Feuerland was a popular 19th-century designation for the industrial nucleus of Berlin. It was located in the historic Oranienburger Vorstadt section of Berlin in today's district Berlin-Mitte. The word literally means “land of fire”, but it is also a play on the German name for Tierra del Fuego.

== History ==
Many companies in the emerging metalworking and mechanical engineering industries settled in the area northeast of the Oranienburger Tor, one of the gates of the 18th-century Berlin Customs Wall, between Chausseestraße (today's Torstraße), Gartenstraße and Liesenstraße.

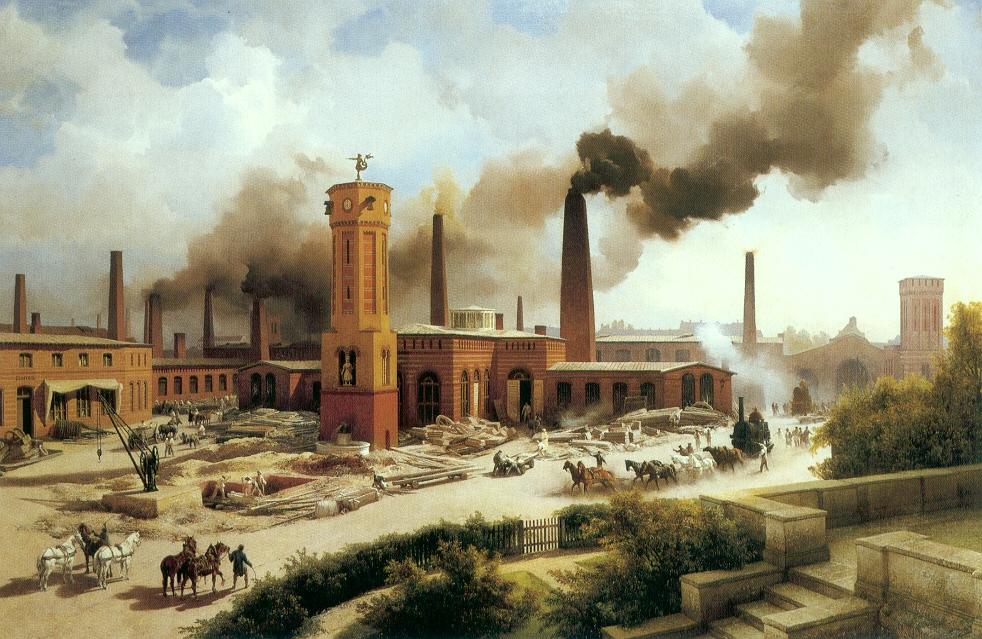
Borsig's machine factory in Chausseestraße. Painting by Karl Eduard Biermann (1847)

For example, in 1804, the Royal Prussian Iron Foundry started producing in Invalidenstraße. In 1826, Franz Anton Egells set up his iron foundry and engineering works at Chausseestraße 3/4, later expanding it to include Chausseestraße 5/6. In 1837, August Borsig established a factory at Chausseestraße 1–3, to be followed in 1839 by Friedrich Adolf Pflug at Chausseestraße 7–9. In 1842 Johann Friedrich Ludwig Wöhlert started an iron foundry and engineering works at Chausseestraße 29.

By 1847, 33 metalworking companies with over 3000 employees were located in this closely circumscribed area, and in 1852 the iron foundry and engineering works of Louis Victor Robert Schwartzkopff also started operations there.

Since all these businesses heavily relied on fire in their production processes and huge amounts of smoke poured into the sky from the diverse chimneys, this part of the city was informally given the now-forgotten name “Feuerland”.

As the city grew, these metalworking companies were unable to expand and either ceased production or by 1880 had moved to what was then the city outskirts, first to Moabit and then after 1900 further out to Spandau or Reinickendorf. Today, only a few street names (Borsigstraße, Pflugstraße, Schwartzkopffstraße and Wöhlertstraße) as well as a building or two remain as a memorial to those times. A panel at the corner of Chausseestraße and Tieckstraße provides information about Berlin's Feuerland.
