= Grid =

Grid, The Grid, or GRID may refer to:

== Space partitioning ==
- Regular grid, a tessellation of space with translational symmetry, typically formed from parallelograms or higher-dimensional analogs
  - Grid graph, a graph structure with nodes connected in a regular grid
  - Square grid, a grid of squares
  - Triangular grid, a grid of triangles
  - Hexagonal grid, a grid of hexagons
  - Unstructured grid, a tessellation of a space by simple shapes such as triangles or tetrahedra in an irregular pattern
- Grid reference system, a coordinate system relative to a particular map projection
- Grid (spatial index), a discretization of a geometric domain into a set of contiguous cells, used to organize information
  - Discrete global grid (DGG), a grid that covers the entire Earth's surface
- Grid (graphic design) (or typographic grid), organized lines for guiding graphic design
- Grid plan, a city design with streets running at right angles
- Grid paper, paper with a regular grid printed on it
- Hex grid, a board game design
- Grid illusion, various optical illusions involving a grid
- Grid view, a graphical user interface component used in spreadsheet software

== Networks ==
- Electrical grid, an interconnected network for electricity delivery
  - Smart grid
  - Super grid, an electrical grid with very large scale
  - Off-the-grid, a lifestyle relatively independent from centralized utilities
- Grid computing

== Arts and entertainment ==
=== Fictional entities ===
- Grid (comics), a fictional character in the DC Comics Universe
- Grid (Jotun), Gríðr, a giantess in Norse mythology
- Grid, a Xenomorph from Alien vs Predator
- The grid, the virtual environment of the game Second Life
- The Grid, the computerized virtual world in which the Tron franchise exists

=== Video games ===
- Grid (series), a series of racing video games developed by Codemasters
  - Race Driver: Grid, the first game in the series
- Spooks 3 Games - The Grid, a video game based on the television show Spooks
- The Grid (video game), a 2001 third-person shooter arcade game

=== Music ===
- Grid (album), a 2006 album by the Japanese band m.o.v.e.
- GRid, Global Release Identifier (GRid), a music industry identifier from the RIAA and IFPI
- Kevorkian Death Cycle, a music group formerly called Grid
- The Grid, a 1990s electronic dance group from London
- "The Grid", a song by To My Boy

=== Television ===
- The Grid (TV serial), a BBC drama from 2004
- "The Grid" (The Outer Limits), an episode of the science fiction series
- The Grid (American TV series), an American TV series
- Mobil 1 The Grid, a motorsport magazine TV show
- Grid (South Korean TV series), a 2022 streaming television series

== Place names ==
- Grid, a village administered by Călan town, Hunedoara County, Romania
- Grid, a village in Părău Commune, Braşov County, Romania
- Grid, a tributary of the Valea Luncanilor River in Hunedoara County, Romania
- Grid, a tributary of the Părău River in Brașov County, Romania

== Other uses ==
- Gay-related immune deficiency, or GRID, an early suggested name for AIDS
- Keith Caldwell (1895–1980), New Zealand air commodore and First World War fighter ace nicknamed "Grid"
- IEEE Grid, a monthly publication of the Institute of Electrical and Electronics Engineers
- Nvidia GRID, a family of graphics processing units
- Grid Systems, an early portable computer manufacturer
- The Grid (newspaper), a former alternative weekly newspaper in Toronto, Ontario
- Global Research Identifier Database, a persistent ID for research institutions worldwide
- GRID (geometry) (Great Rhomb-Icosi-Dodecahedron) or truncated icosidodecahedron
- Firebird Grid, a German paraglider design
- Grid fin, a control surface used on missiles and bombs

== See also ==
- Graticule (disambiguation)
- Lattice (disambiguation)
- Network (disambiguation)
- Mesh (disambiguation)
- GRID1, a human gene
- GRID2, a human gene
