= Julius Scholtz =

German painter (1825–1893)

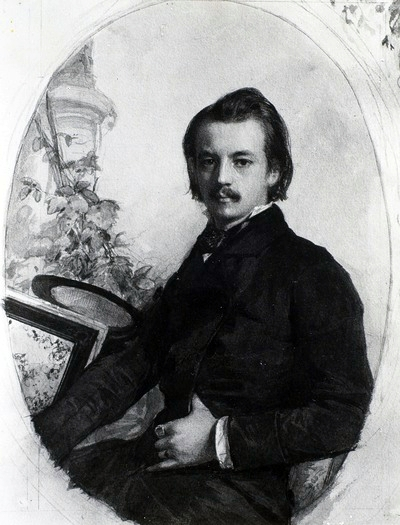
Julius Scholtz (date unknown)

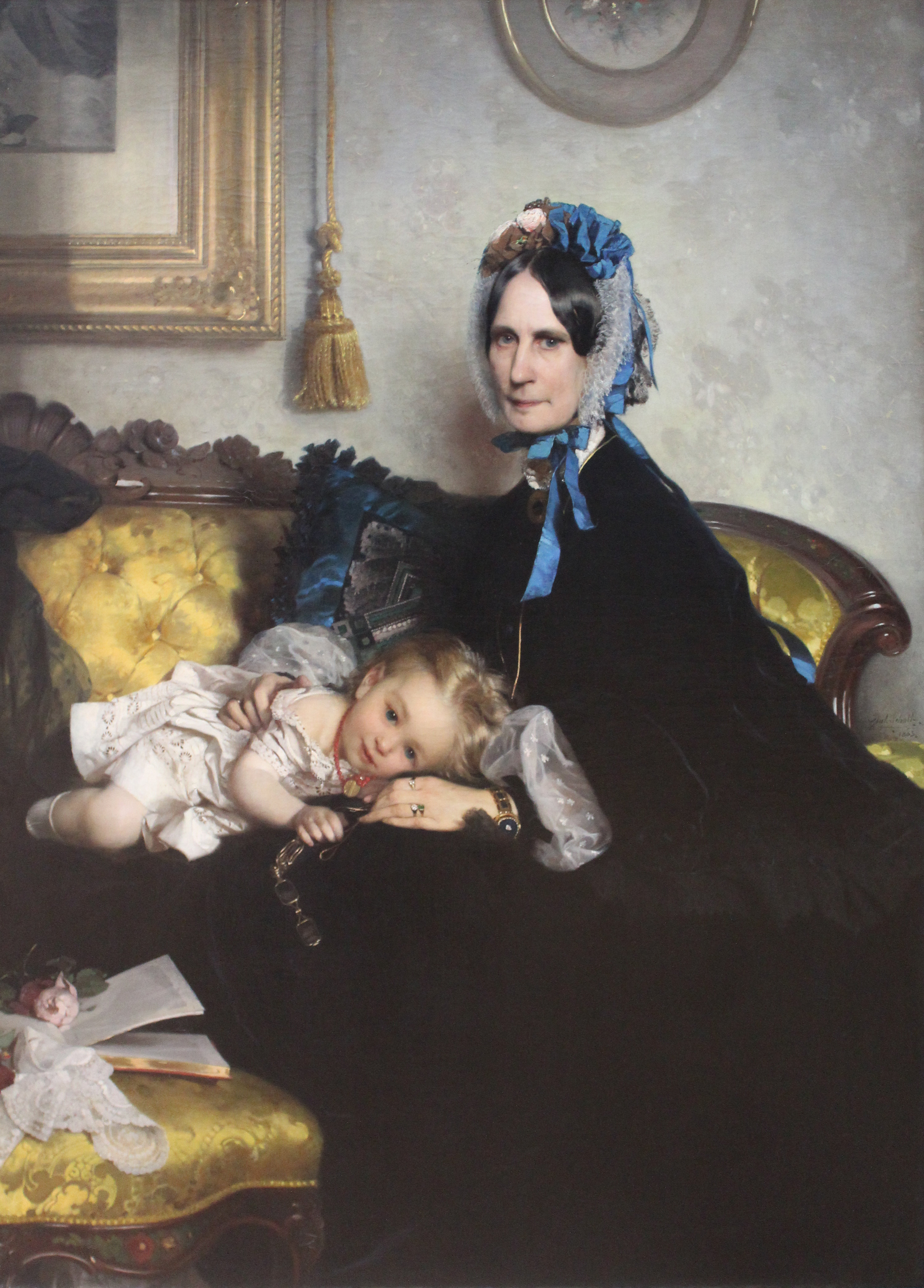
Grandmother and Granddaughter; featured on an East German postage stamp in 1967

Gottfried Julius Scholtz (12 February 1825; Breslau – 2 May 1893; Dresden) was a German history and portrait painter.

== Life and work ==
He initially studied at the Dresden Academy of Fine Arts, with Julius Hübner, and had his first exhibition there in 1858. One of his works was given an award by the Association for Historical Art in 1862, and another was purchased for King John of Saxony in 1866.

Between 1863 and 1867, he lived in St. Petersburg, at the invitation of the Baron and banker, Hermann Christian von Kap-herr (1801-1877). There, he painted six larger than life-size portraits of members of the Kap-herr family.

In 1870, he received several offers to become an honorary Professor, from Kassel, Königsberg and Weimar, while the academies in Berlin and Munich named him a member. This may have prompted the Dresden Academy to offer him a well-paid academic teaching post but, rather than assign him the studio being vacated by Julius Schnorr von Carolsfeld, he was placed in a room with three other teachers.

When the restoration of the Albrechtsburg was nearing its final phase, in 1873, eleven local artists, including Scholtz, were commissioned to provide decorative paintings. He began his work in 1875; nine historical murals which took until the mid 1880s to be completed. They were a series; depicting scenes from the life of Albert III, Duke of Saxony.

This brought him a flood of commissions for murals, all of which he had to refuse because he was overwhelmed with commissions for portraits. Until 1885, he was active as an illustrator. He had also been appointed a Professor at the Dresden Academy in 1874, so spare time was a rare luxury.

He died in Dresden in 1893 and was interred at the Trinitatisfriedhof. That same year, the National Gallery in Berlin held a comprehensive special exhibition of his works.

A street in the Mockritz district of Dresden is named after him. His son, Walther also became a painter.

== Sources ==
- Hermann Arthur Lier (1908). "Scholtz, Julius". Allgemeine Deutsche Biographie (in German). Vol. 54. Leipzig: Duncker & Humblot. pp. 152–153.
- Heike Biedermann: Julius Scholtz (1825–1893): Ausstellung der Gemäldegalerie Neue Meister im Albertinum vom 10. Juli bis 9. November 1999. In: Dresdener Kunstblätter. #43, 1999, pp. 150–157.
- Hans Joachim Neidhardt: "Julius Scholtz und das Problem des Malerischen in der Dresdner Malerei des 19. Jahrhunderts", In: Wissenschaftliche Zeitschrift der Karl-Marx-Univ. Leipzig. Gesellschafts- und sprachwiss. Reihe, Vol.12, #2, 1963, pp. 364–372.
- Robert Becker: Julius Scholtz und die Ausstellung von Zeichnungen und Studien aus seinem Nachlass im Schlesisches Museum der Bildenden Künste. Korn, Breslau 1912
