= Trellis (disambiguation) =

A Trellis is an architectural structure often used to support plants (especially vineyards).

Trellis may also refer to:

== Technology ==
- Trellis (graph), a special kind of graph used in computer science
- Trellis chart, a series or grid of small similar graphics or charts, allowing them to be easily compared
- Trellis modulation or trellis coded modulation, in telecommunications
- Trellis quantization, a method of improving data compression, often used in lossy video compression

== People ==
- Jonathan Whitehead (born 1960), composer who sometimes publishes under the name "Trellis"
- Oswald Trellis (born 1935), Dean of St George's Cathedral

== Other uses ==
- Mrs. Trellis of North Wales, a fictional radio correspondent in I'm Sorry I Haven't a Clue
- Trellis drainage pattern, a drainage system

== See also ==
- Lattice (disambiguation)
- Trestle bridge, a bridge that consists of a number of short spans
- Truss, a structure typically made of five or more triangular units
