= Lee Reynolds (theatre producer) =

American theatre manager

Lee Reynolds was a Broadway theatre and television producer. She was Tony Award nominated for The Changing Room in 1973. Previously she had been an actress and a singer.

https://www.findagrave.com/memorial/191486701/lee-begelman
