= Mesh-29 =

English indie rock band

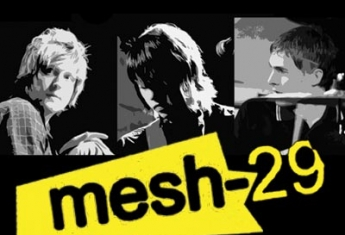

Background information
- Origin: Whittlesey, England
- Genres: Indie rock, acoustic, pop-rock
- Instruments: Vocals, Piano, Guitar
- Years active: 2005–2010
- Label: Media Addiction Records
- Past members: Adam Mezzatesta; Anthony Shiels; Dave Jackson; Lee Reynolds
- Website: Mesh29.com

Mesh-29 were an English indie rock band from Whittlesey, Peterborough, England. The band formed in 1999 and consisted of Adam Mezzatesta on lead vocals and guitar and Anthony Shiels on the piano.

Mesh-29 entered the Top 40 of the UK Singles Chart with their single "Over The Barricade", reaching number 35 on 8 July 2007; only the second unsigned band in history of the UK chart to achieve such a result.

The band played their last gig on 9 October 2010.

== Biography ==
On 2 July 2007, Mesh-29 released their single "Over The Barricade", which reached number 35 in the UK Singles Chart. The band supported Scouting for Girls and Air Traffic amongst others. On 30 August 2007, they were interviewed (and played three live tracks) on the Janice Long show on BBC Radio 2.

The album closer, "Alone", was used on the soundtrack to the MTV series, The Hills.

Their second album Secret Traffic was released in the UK in October 2008 after their promotion single "White Light" was released on 13 October and the music video was produced by Leon Mitchell. The music video for "WIde Awake" was also produced by Leon Mitchell. During the 'Secret Traffic' tour, Adam and Anthony have been joined on stage by 'The Secret Traffic Band' consisting of Scott McEwan on bass and John Wright on drums.

== Present day ==
Anthony Shiels continues to write and perform with his new band, The Candle Thieves. Adam Mezzatesta has since set up music agency, Bands For Hire, and continues to perform at private events.

== Discography ==
=== Studio albums ===
Year	Album	Label
2007	Dead Machine	AMS Records
2008	Secret Traffic	Media Addiction Records

=== Singles ===
Year	Title	Chart position		Label
Year	Title	UK	UK Indie Chart	Label
2007	"Over the Barricade"	35	—	Media Addiction Records
2009	"Wide Awake"	—	7	Media Addiction Records
2009	"—" denotes releases that did not chart.			
