= Karl Eduard Biermann =

German painter (1803–92)

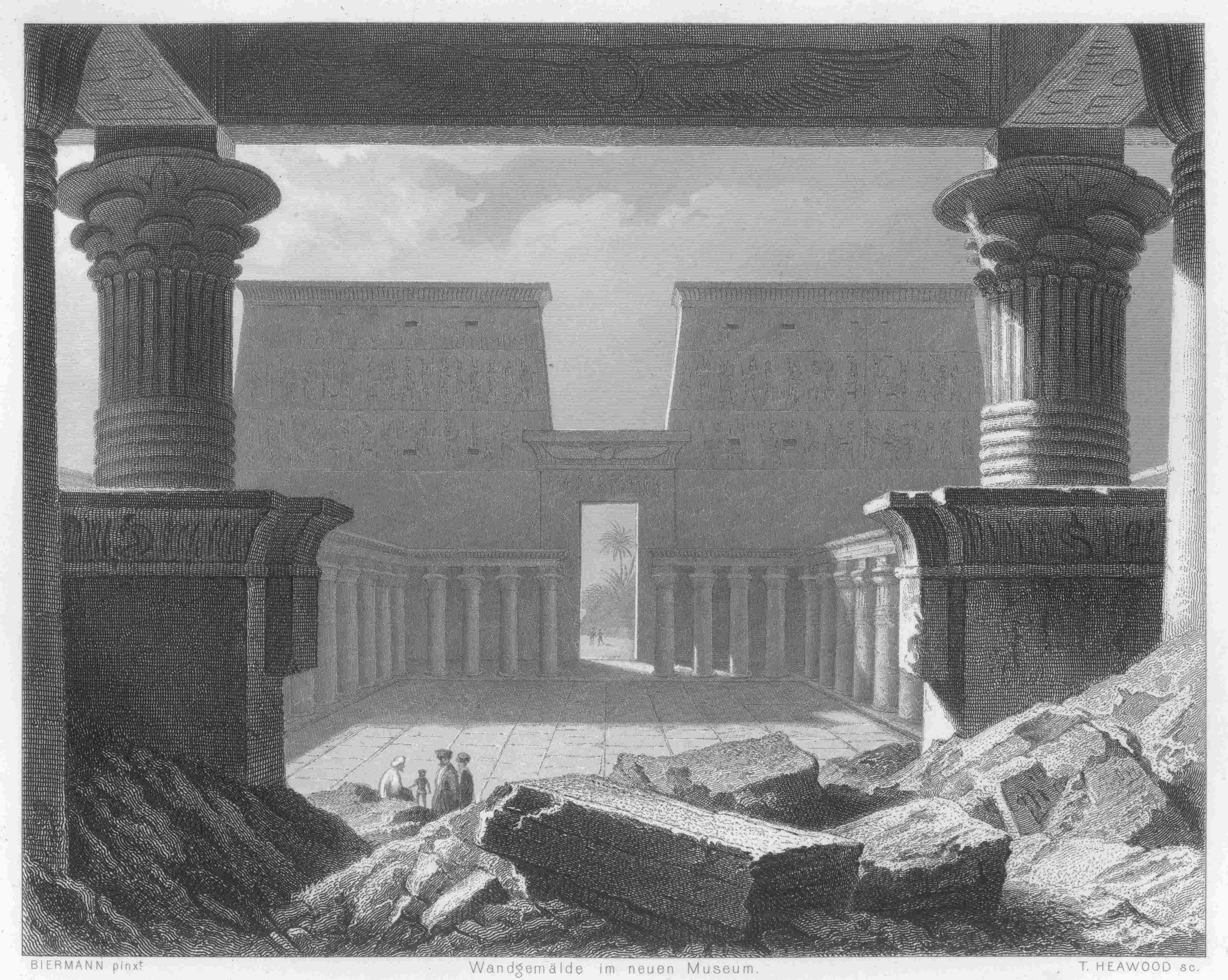
The Forecourt of the Temple of Edfu

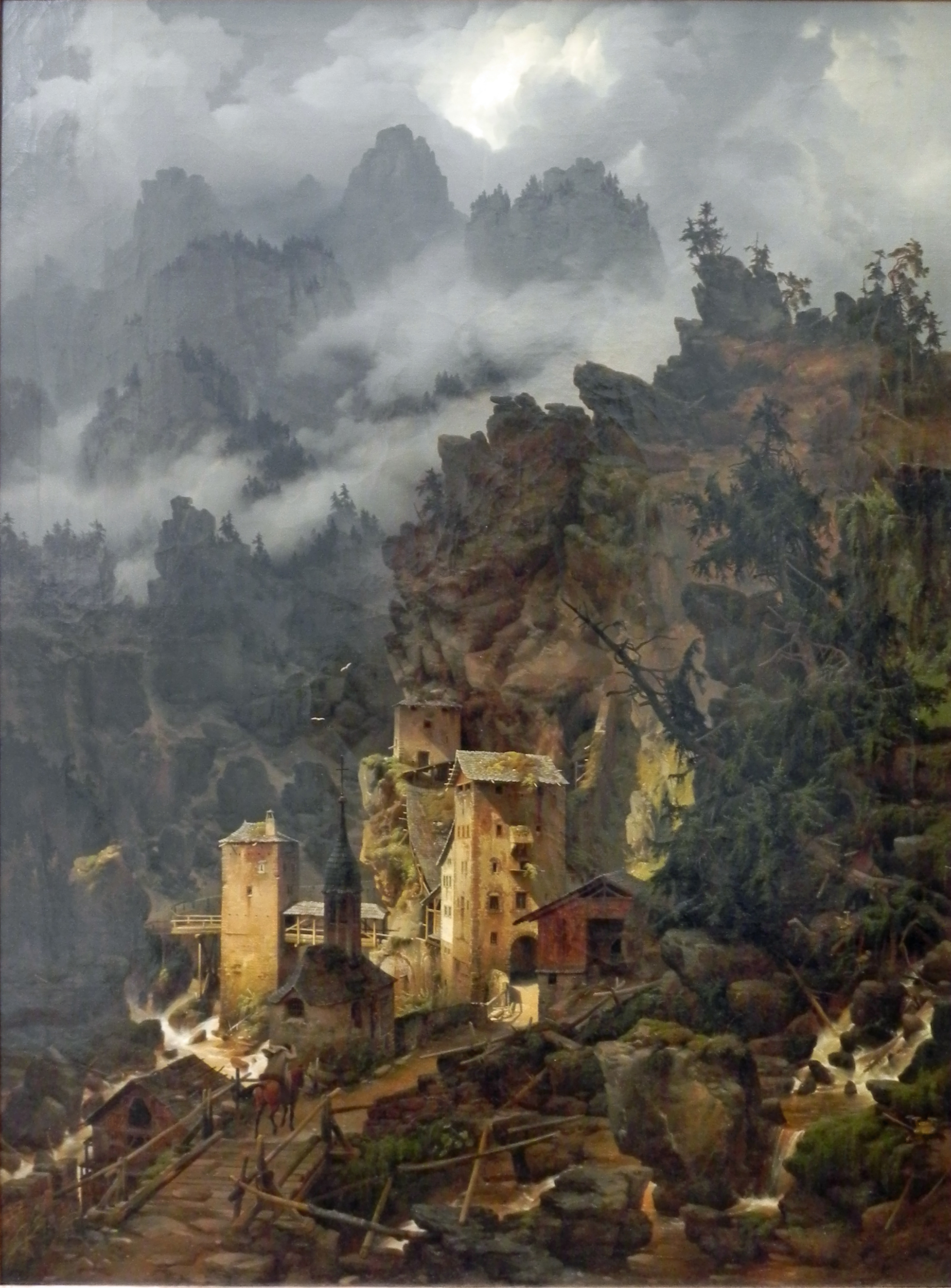
Finstermünz Pass in the Tyrol, 1830

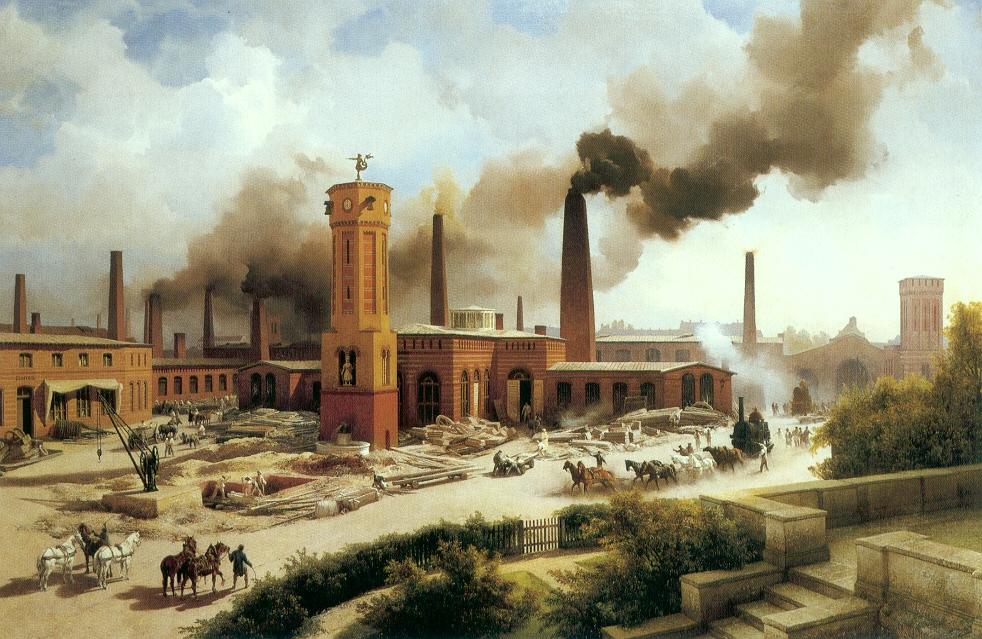
Borsig Ironworks, Berlin, 1847

Karl Eduard Biermann (1803–1892) was a German landscape painter.

== Early life ==
Karl Eduard Biermann was born and died in Berlin. He was a professor at the Academy of Arts, Berlin for some time and known as the first decorative painter and being one of the founders of the most prominent members of the Berlin School of Landscape Painting.

== Achievements ==
- Artworks (22)
- Auction results
- Articles (2)
- Performance
