= Realism (art movement) =

19th-century artistic movement

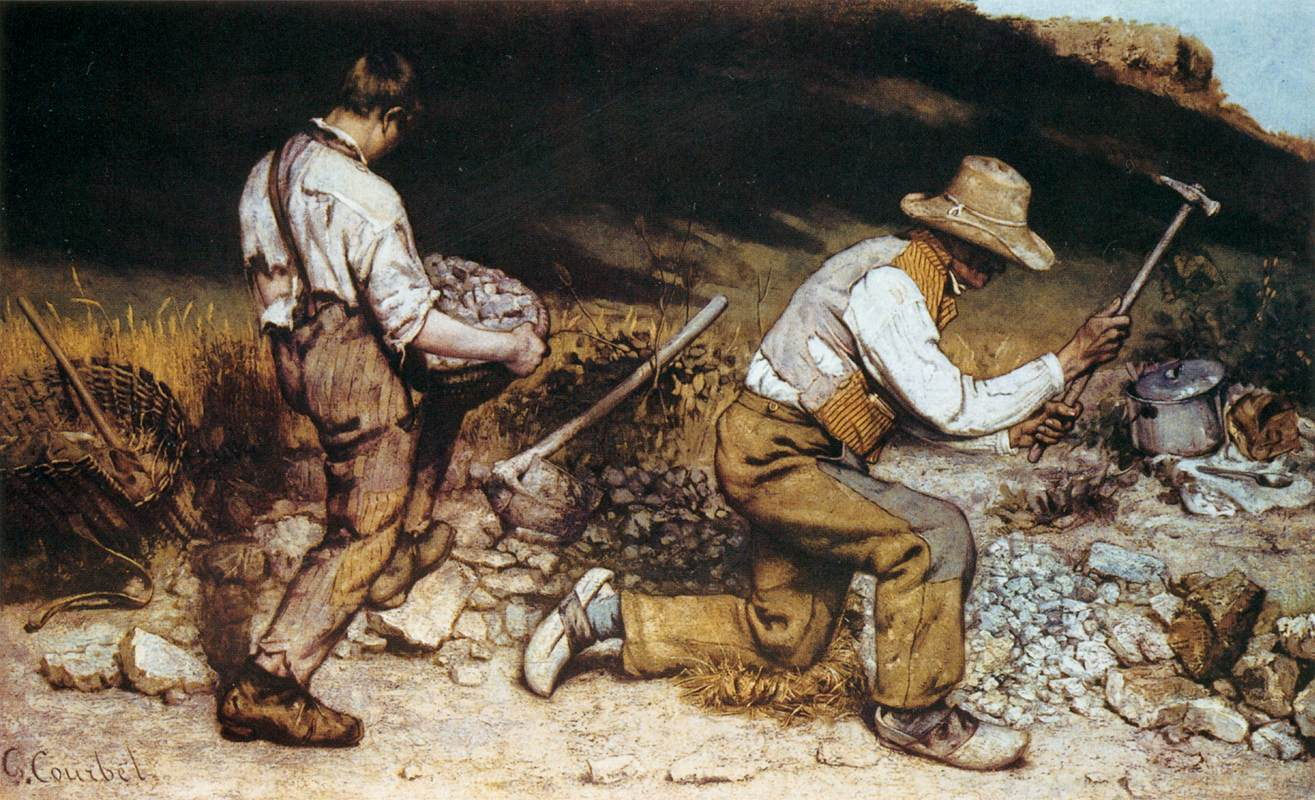
Gustave Courbet, The Stone Breakers (1849)

Realism was an artistic movement that emerged in France in the 1840s. Realists rejected Romanticism, which had dominated French literature and art since the early 19th century. The artist Gustave Courbet, the original proponent of Realism, sought to portray real and typical contemporary people and situations with truth and accuracy, not avoiding unpleasant or sordid aspects of life. Realism revolted against the exotic subject matter, exaggerated emotionalism, and the drama of the Romantic movement, often focusing on unidealized subjects and events that were previously rejected in artwork. Realist works depicted people of all social classes in situations that arise in ordinary life, and often reflected the changes brought by the Industrial and Commercial Revolutions. Realism was primarily concerned with how things appeared to the eye, rather than containing ideal representations of the world. Realism spread to other countries, maintaining similar principles with some differences arising from the artistic background of the individual countries and artists.

== Historical context ==
Scholars theorize that Realism was influenced by multiple intersecting societal conditions in the mid-1800s, including the suffrage movement, urban immigration, social class tensions, and economic difficulties caused by the Industrial and Commercial Revolutions. In 1848-49, there were multiple uprisings in Europe including in France, the German states, the Italian states, Hungary, and Poland. Courbet's first Realist works in 1849 and later artworks often depicted poor and working-class peoples, which were not the focus of artists previously, as Romantic art portrayed a beautiful and idealized world. This social component of Realism is demonstrated in varying degrees across Realism in different countries.

== Beginnings of Realism in France ==
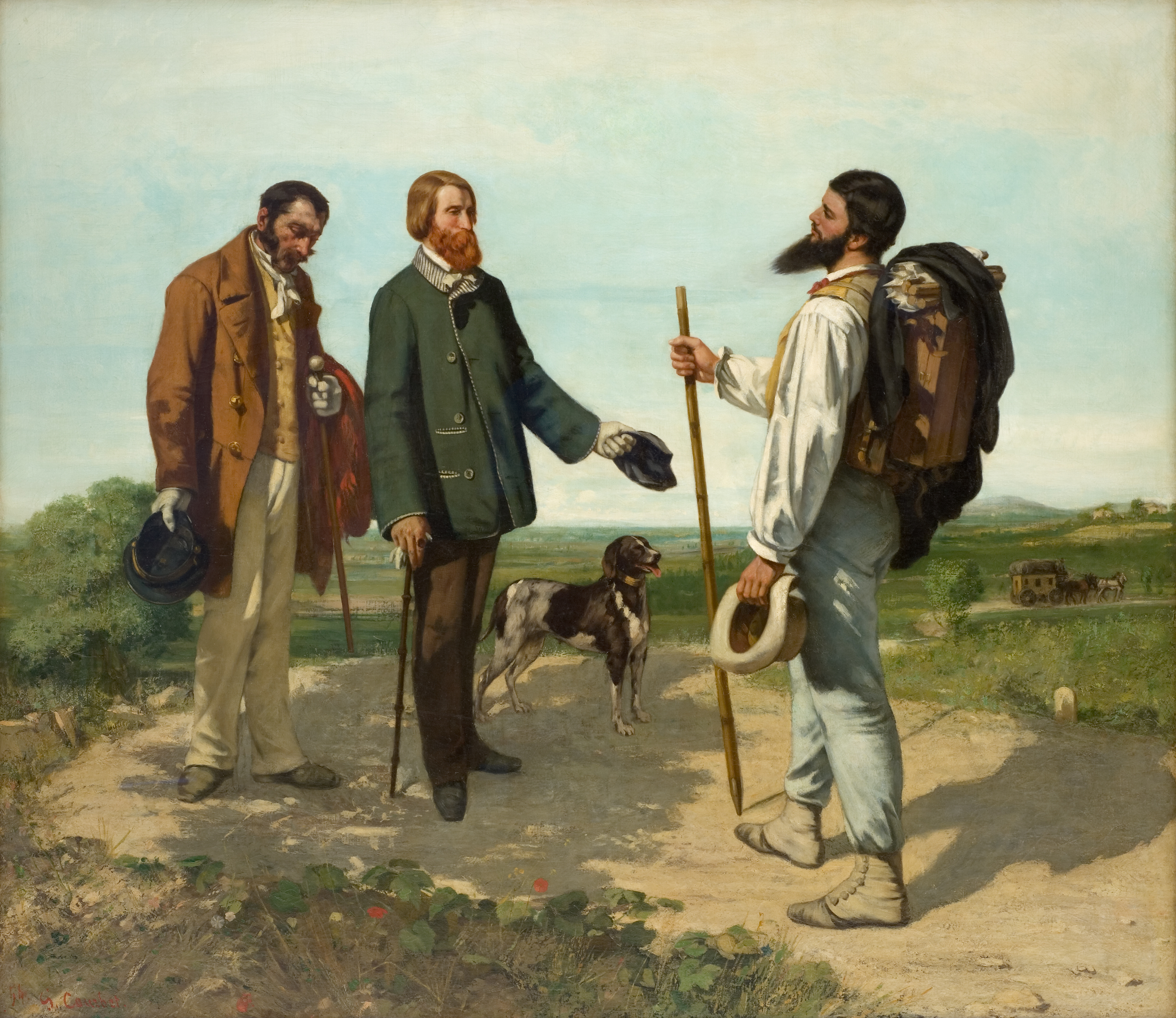
Gustave Courbet, The Meeting (1854)

The Realist movement began in the mid-19th century as a reaction to Romanticism and History painting. In favor of depictions of real life, the Realist painters used common laborers, and ordinary people in ordinary surroundings engaged in real activities as subjects for their works. The chief exponents of Realism in France were Gustave Courbet, Jean-François Millet, Honoré Daumier, and Jean-Baptiste-Camille Corot. Jules Bastien-Lepage is closely associated with the beginning of Naturalism, an artistic style that emerged from the later phase of the Realist movement and heralded the arrival of Impressionism. The Realism art movement coincided with the naturalist literature movement of Émile Zola, Honoré de Balzac, and Gustave Flaubert.

Courbet was the leading proponent of Realism and he challenged the popular history painting that was favored at the state-sponsored art academy. His paintings A Burial at Ornans and The Stonebreakers depict ordinary people and were done on huge canvases that would typically be used for history paintings. Although Courbet's early works emulated the sophisticated manner of Old Masters such as Rembrandt and Titian, after 1848 he adopted a boldly inelegant style inspired by popular prints, shop signs, and other work of folk artisans. In The Stonebreakers, his first painting to create a controversy, Courbet eschewed the pastoral tradition of representing human subjects in harmony with nature. Rather, he depicted two men juxtaposed against a charmless, stony roadside. The concealment of their faces emphasizes the dehumanizing nature of their monotonous, repetitive labor.

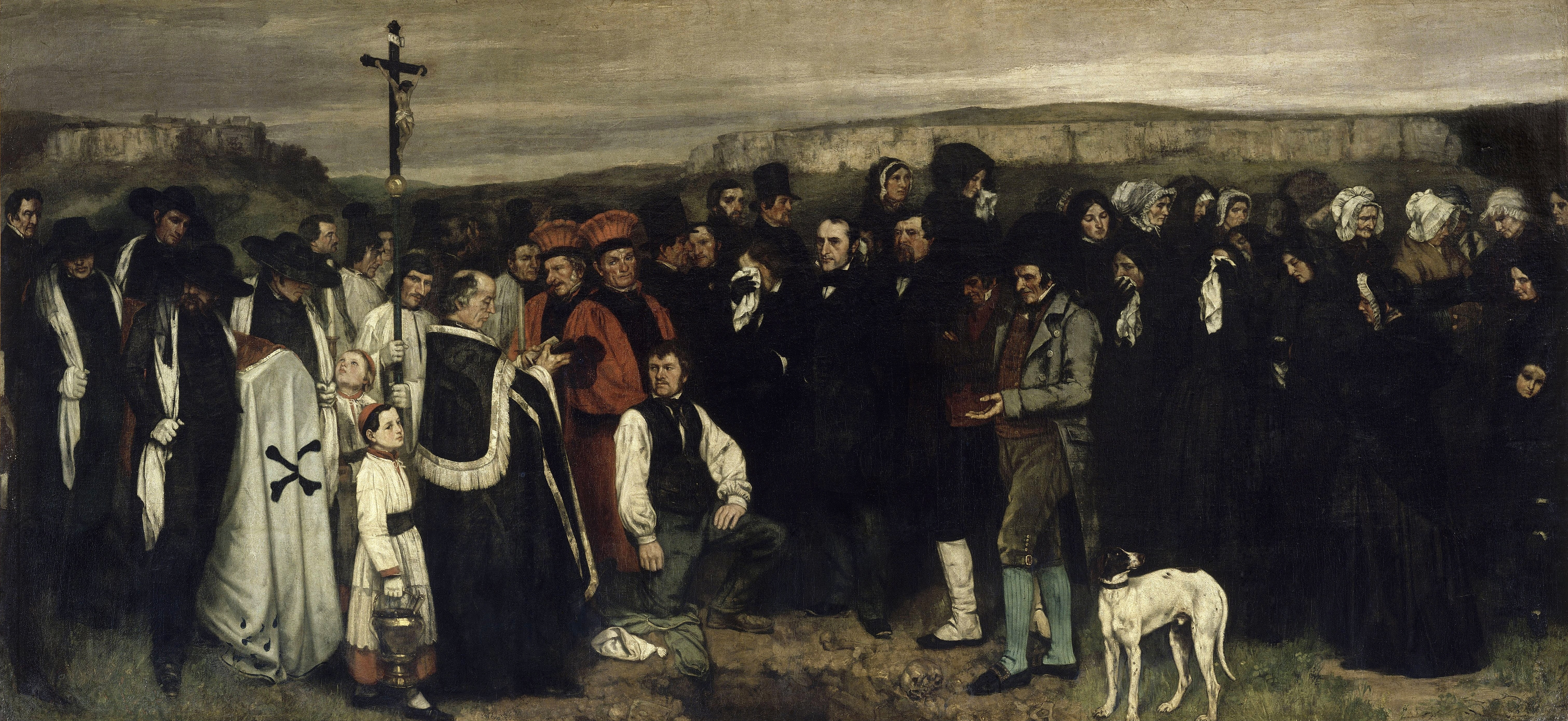
Gustave Courbet, A Burial At Ornans, 1849

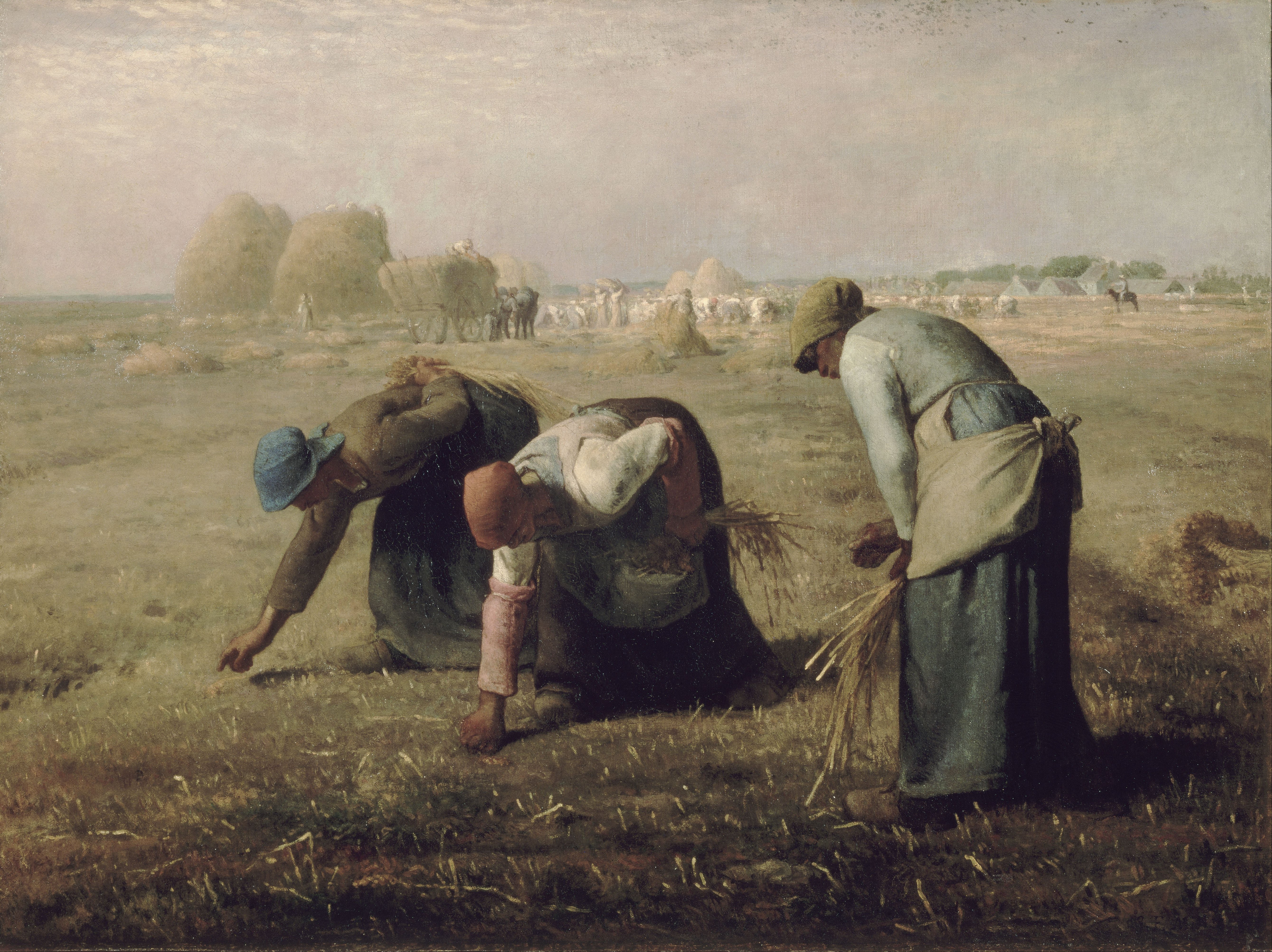
Jean-François Millet, The Gleaners, 1857

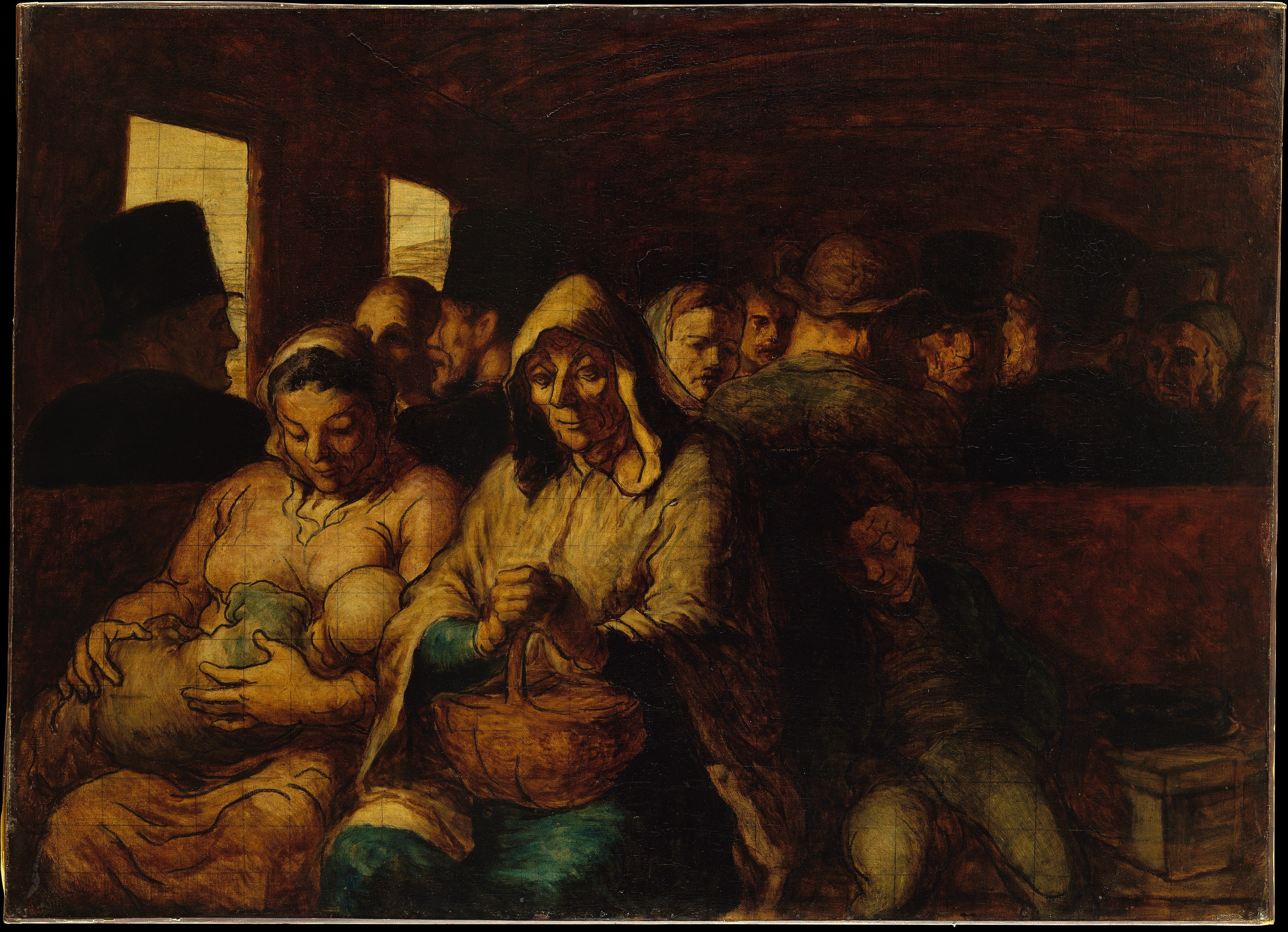
Honoré Daumier, The Third Class Carriage, 1862–1864

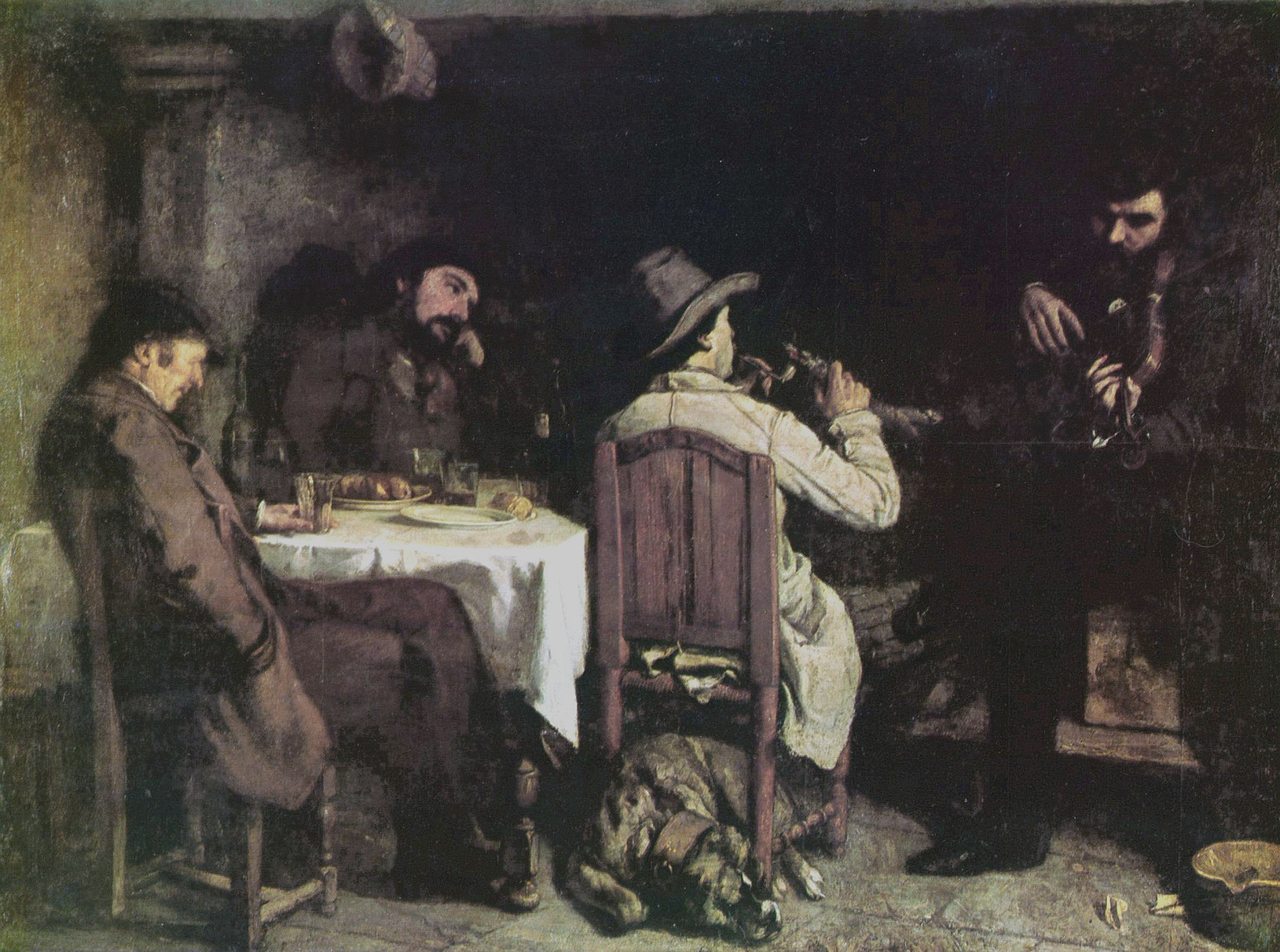
Gustave Courbet, After Dinner at Ornans, 1849

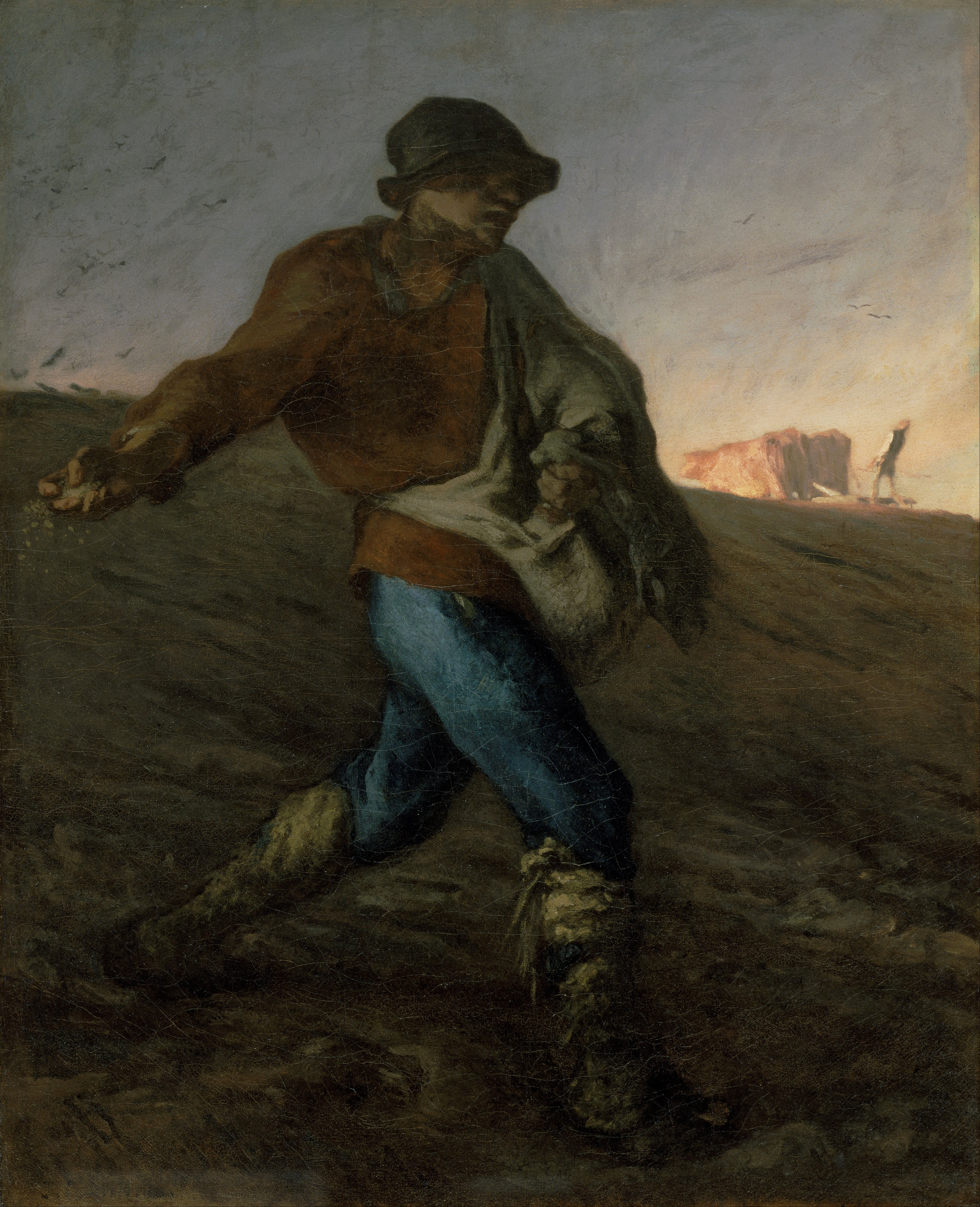
Jean-François Millet, The Sower, 1850

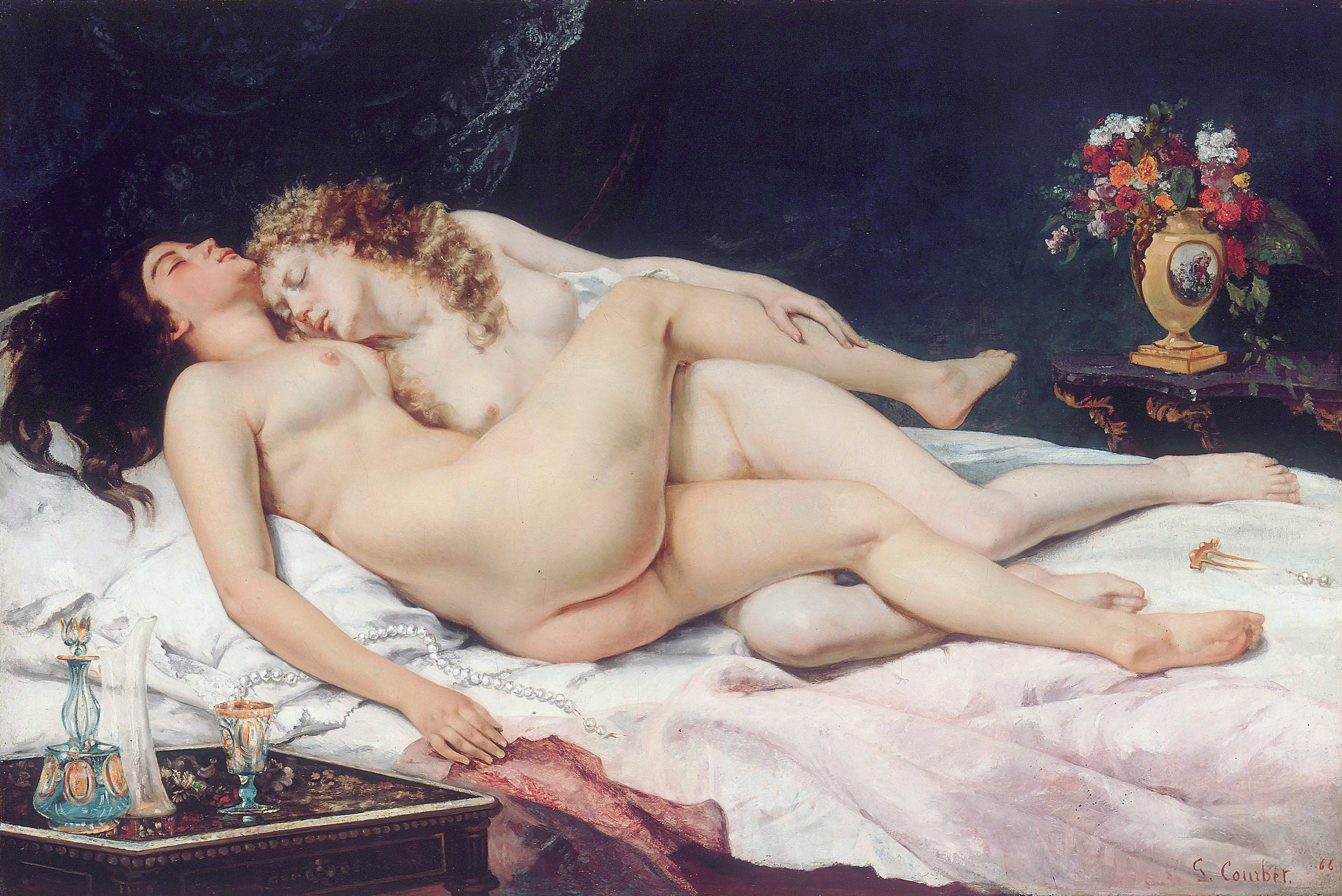
Gustave Courbet, Le Sommeil (Sleep), 1866, Petit Palais, Musée des Beaux-Arts de la Ville de Paris

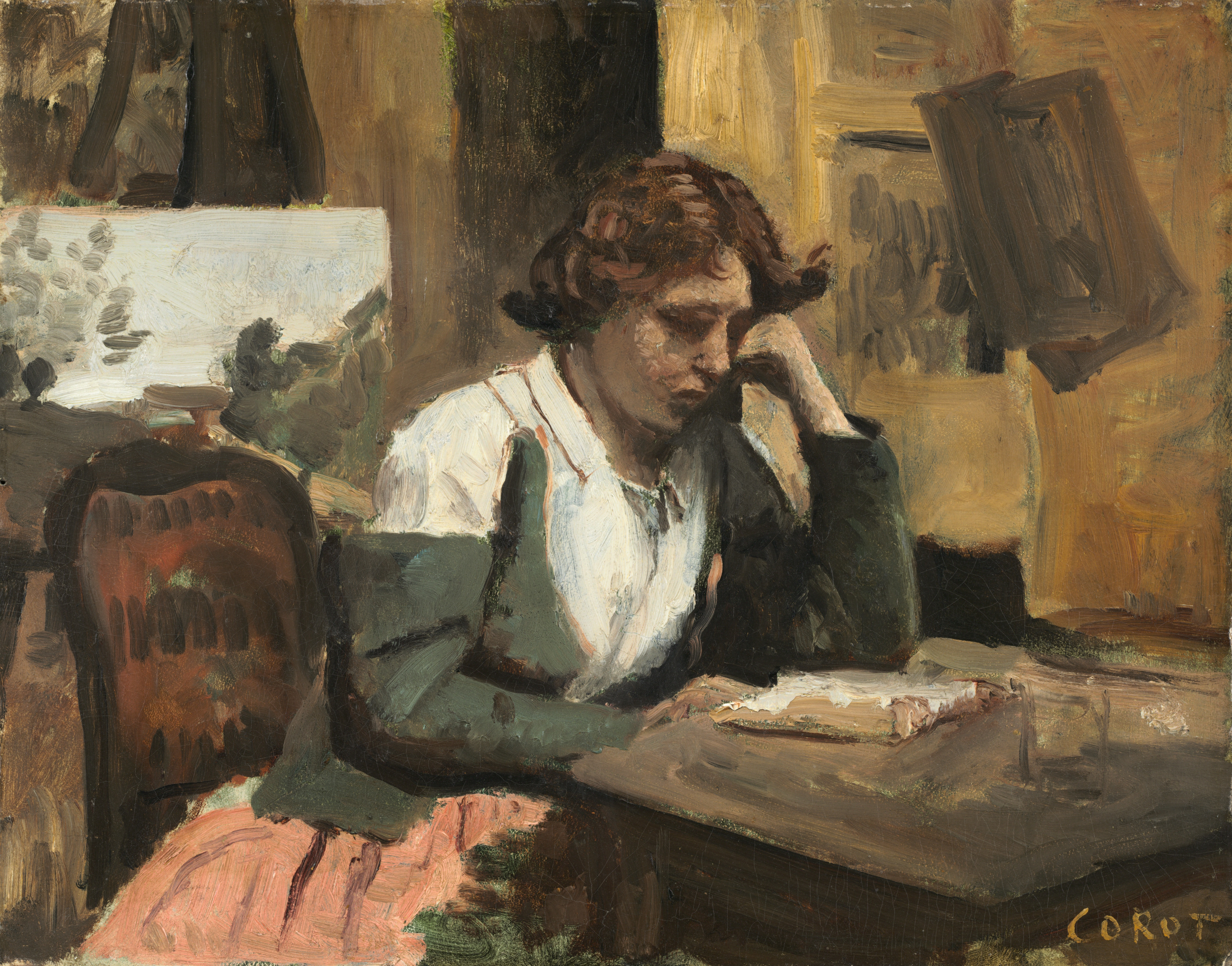
Jean-Baptiste-Camille Corot, Young Girl Reading, 1868, National Gallery of Art

Édouard Manet, Breakfast in the Studio (the Black Jacket), New Pinakothek, Munich, Germany, 1868

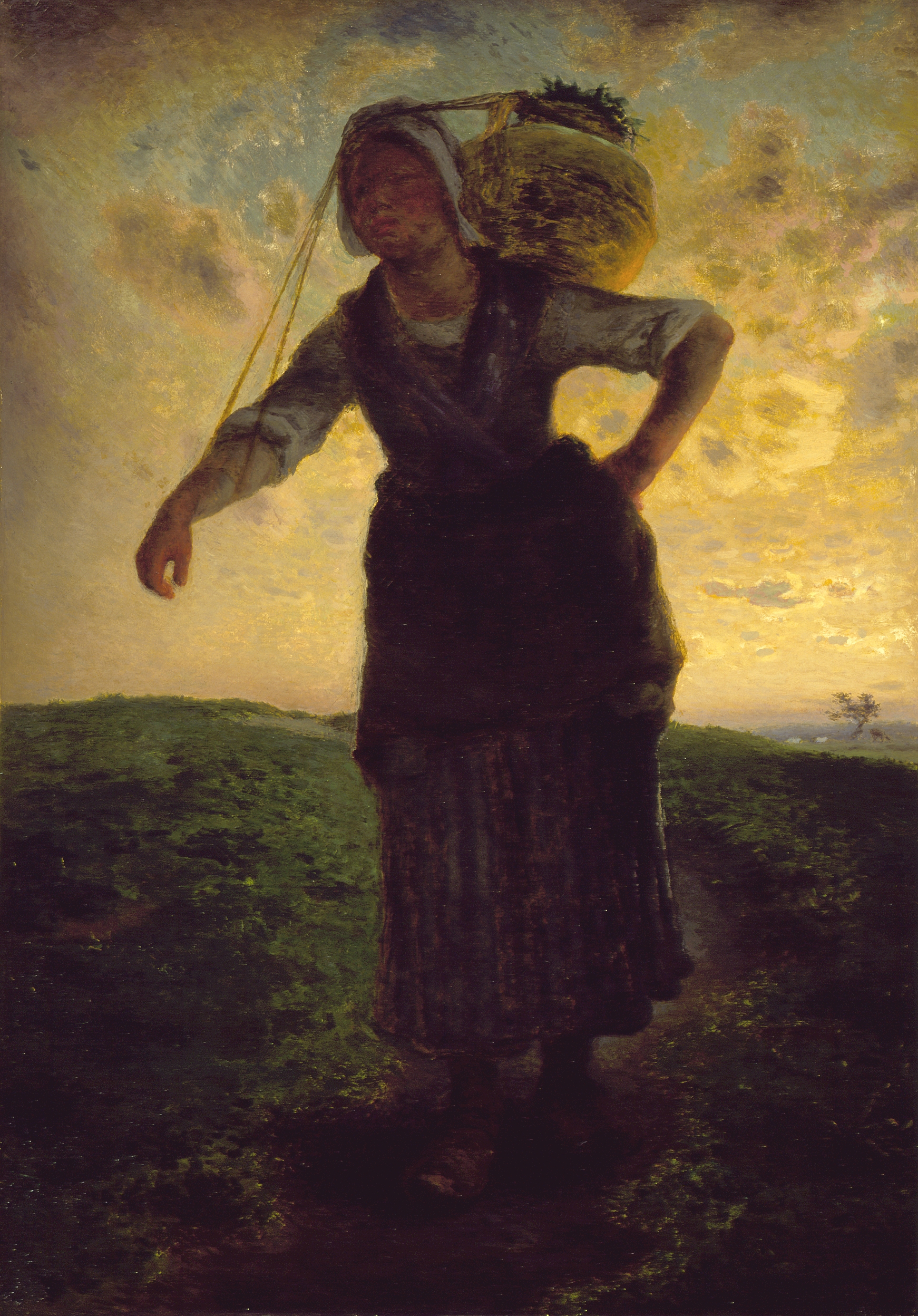
Jean-François Millet, A Norman Milkmaid at Gréville, 1871

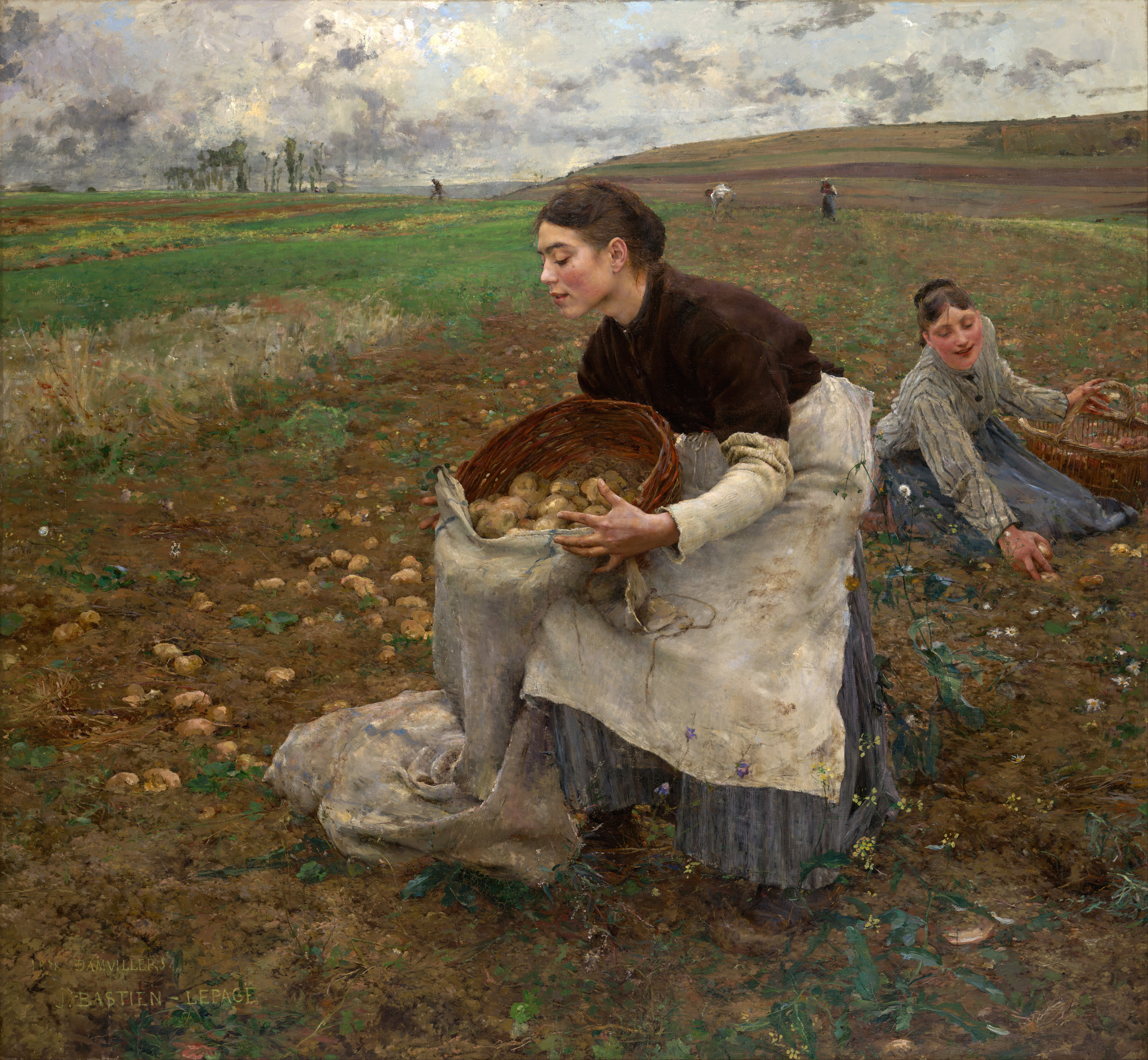
Jules Bastien-Lepage, October, 1878, National Gallery of Victoria

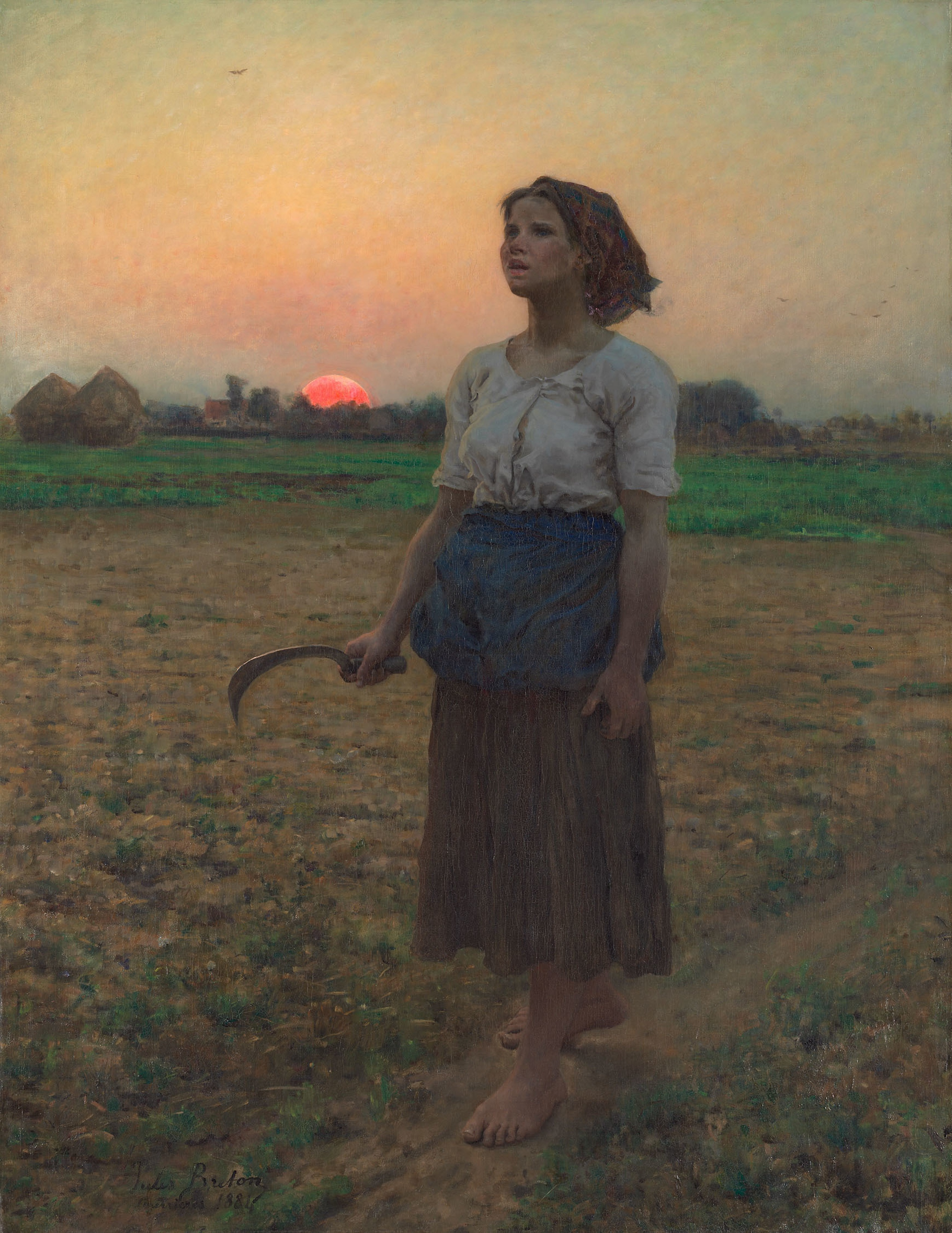
Jules Breton, The Song of the Lark, 1884

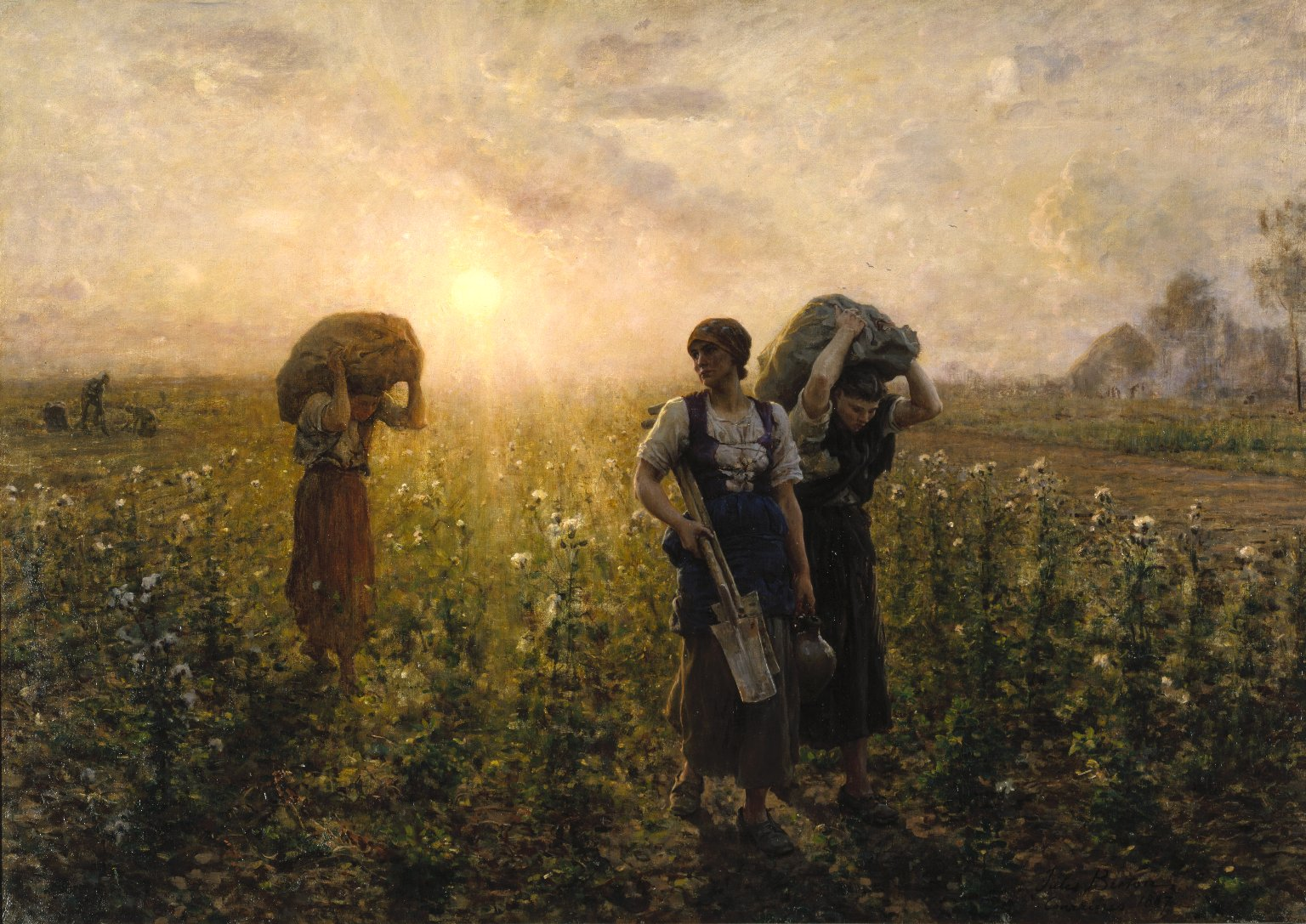
Jules Breton, The End of the Working Day, 1886–87

== Spread abroad ==
The French Realist movement had stylistic and ideological equivalents in other Western countries, developing somewhat later. The Realist movement in France was characterized by a spirit of rebellion against powerful official support for history painting and the desire to paint the world as it really is instead of an idealized version. In countries where institutional support of history painting was less dominant, the transition from existing traditions of genre painting to Realism presented no such schism. The Realist art movement spread as French Realist paintings were exhibited in other European countries and foreign artists were exposed to Realism while studying and traveling in European art centers like Paris and Munich.

=== Germany ===
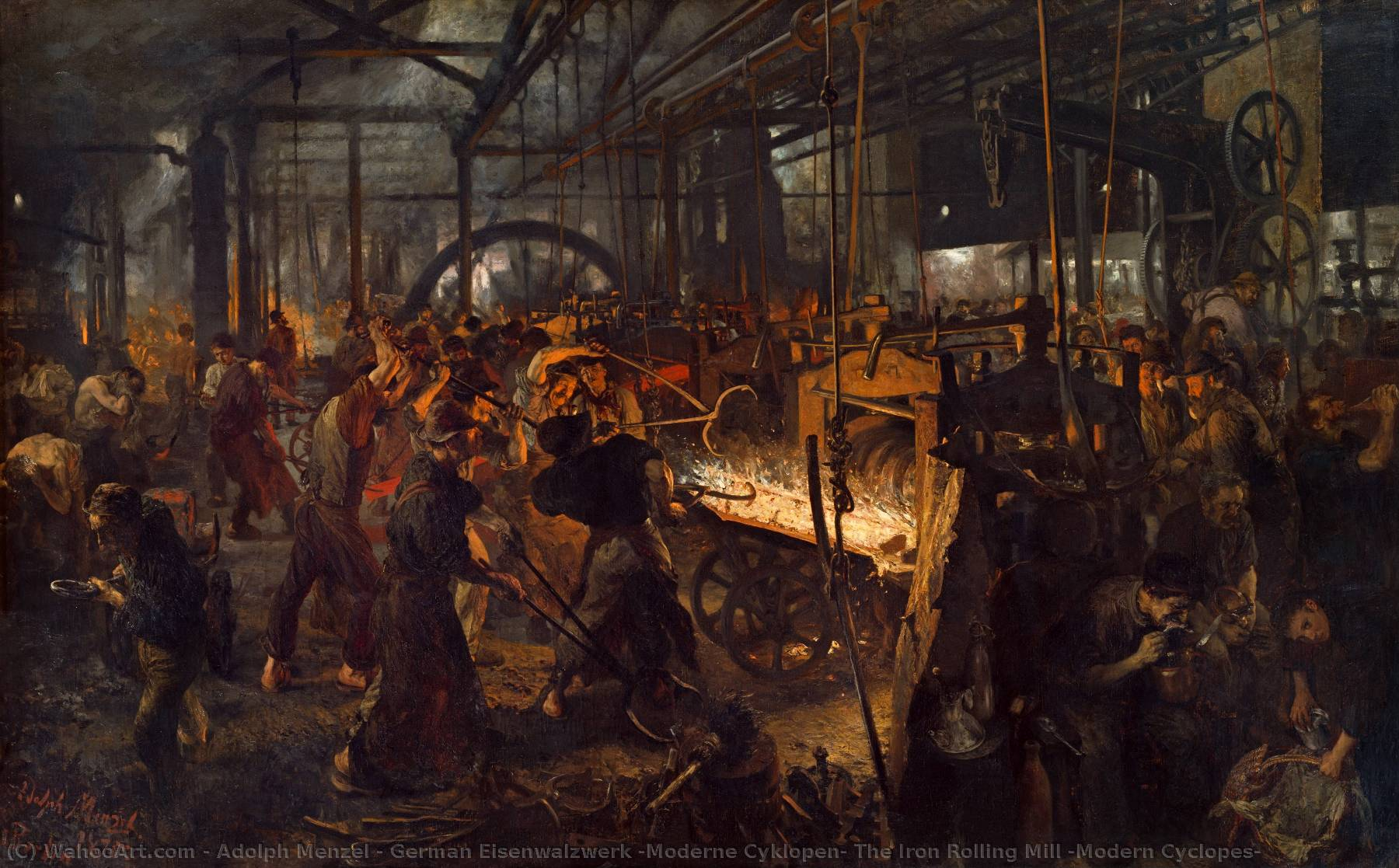
Adolph Menzel, The Iron Rolling Mill (Modern Cyclops) (1872-75)

Courbet's influence was felt most strongly in Germany, where prominent Realists included Adolph Menzel, Wilhelm Leibl, Wilhelm Trübner, and Max Liebermann. Leibl and several other young German painters met Courbet in 1869 when he visited Munich to exhibit his works and demonstrate his manner of painting from nature. Leibl then spent a year in Paris before returning to Munich and formed the Leibl Circle in 1871 to focus on realism in painting with other artists from the Academy of Fine Arts in Munich. Much of Leibl's body of work is paintings of ordinary people, including Three Women in Church (1881).

Adolf Menzel is another prominent Realist artist, beginning as a lithographer in Berlin and teaching himself to paint in the 1840s. Over his career, Menzel painted a variety of subjects, including nature, portraits, and ballrooms filled with people. Two of his most famous works include Laying Out the March Dead (1848), depicting the civilian coffins after the March Revolution in Berlin, and an industrial factory scene, The Iron Rolling Mill (1872–75).

=== Russia ===
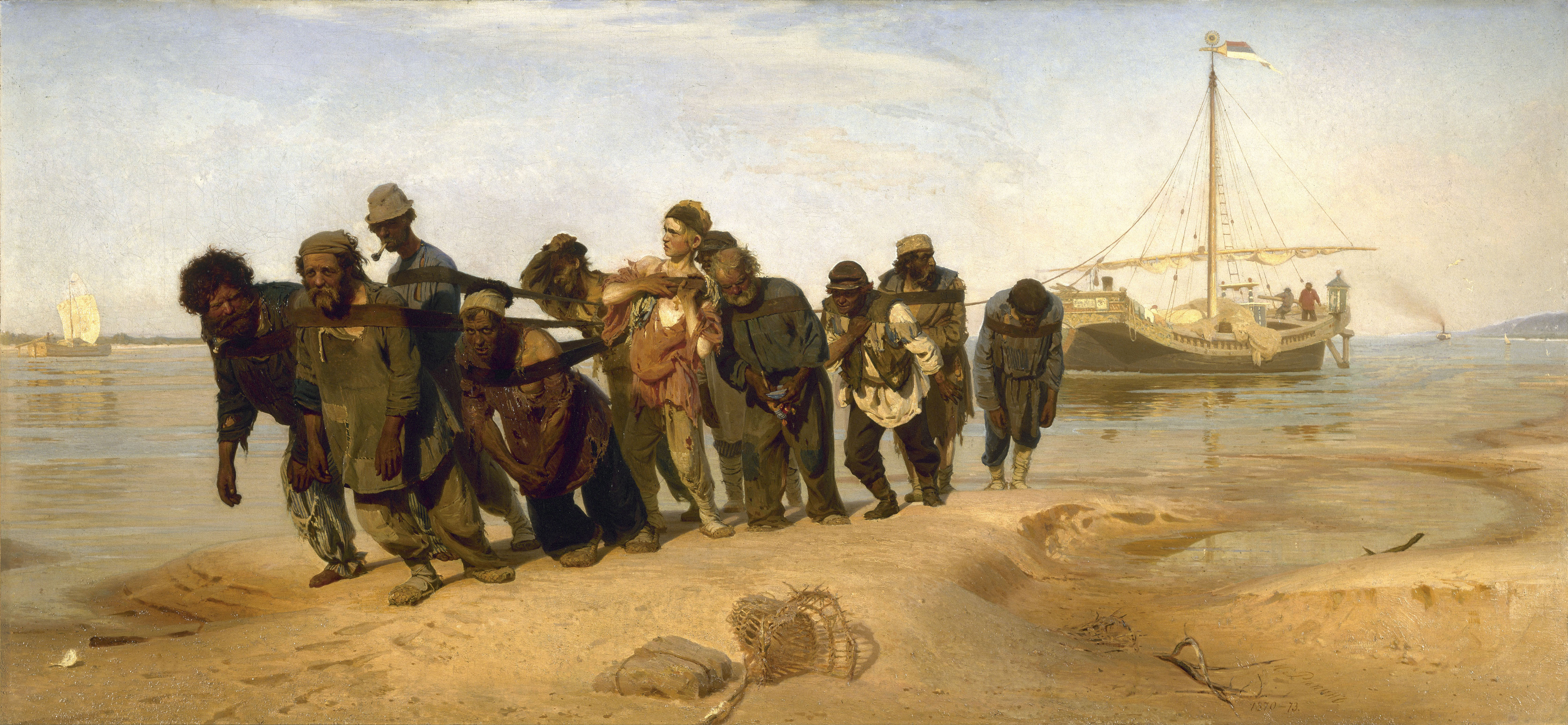
Ilya Repin, Barge Haulers on the Volga, 1870–73

Realism in Russia arose in the 1850s and 1860s. Due to dissatisfaction with the Academy and the Czar, many art students left the school and began traveling exhibitions, painting peasants and rural life in the countryside, becoming known as the Peredvizhniki (the Travelers, Wanderers, Itinerants). Some of these Travelers include genre artist Vasily Perov, landscape artists Ivan Shishkin, Alexei Savrasov, and Arkhip Kuindzhi, portraitist Ivan Kramskoy, and historical artist Vasily Surikov. Some of the most well-known of the Russian Realists are Ilya Repin, for his paintings of peasants like Barge Haulers on the Volga (1870–73) and themes of revolution, and Vassili Vereschagin, for this art depicting warfare and his travels in India.

=== Italy ===
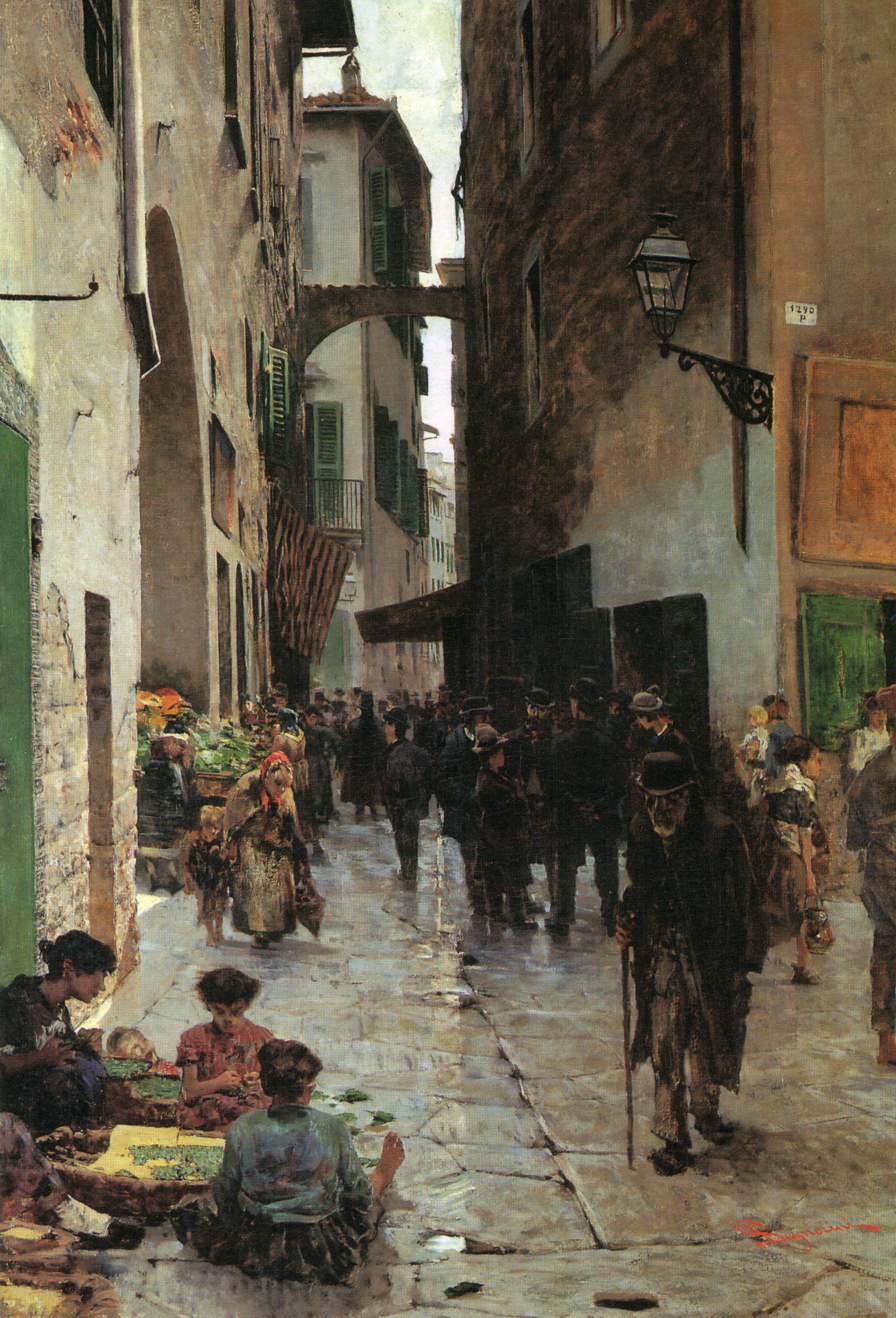
Telemaco Signorini, Ghetto of Florence (1882)

In Italy, the Macchiaioli artist group formed between 1853 and 1860, influenced by the Realism art style when some of the members traveled to Paris. The Macchiaioli rejected the formalities of the Florentine Accademia di Belle Arti, instead painting Realist scenes of rural and urban life. When not painting in the Tuscan countryside, some members spent time in Florence and at the Caffé Michelangiolo, a common meeting place for thinkers and artists in the mid-19th century. The Macchiaioli also were involved with the Italian unification movement, the Risorgimento.

Originally called the Effettisti (effet: French for light effects), for their attention to light and shading in painting, they adopted their name after a critic called them macchia, meaning "spot" and "stain." Though considered Realist, their art style has drawn comparisons to the brightness of Romanticism and the attention to light as with the Impressionists. The Macchiaioli's paintings include an array of rural landscapes and peasants, urban scenes and laborers, and battle paintings. Some of the Macchiaioli artists include Giovanni Fattori, Serafino De Tivoli, Silvestro Lega, and Telemaco Signorini.

=== The Netherlands ===
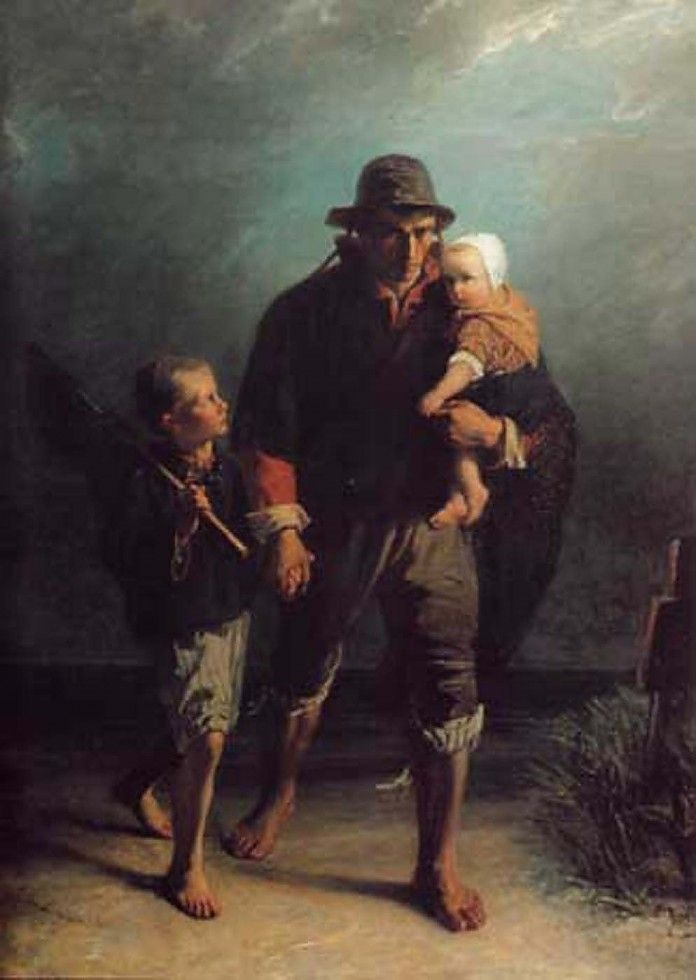
Jozef Israëls, Passing Mother's Grave (1856)

The Hague School was a group of Realist artists based in The Hague, Netherlands between 1860 and 1900, influenced by the Barbizon School of landscapes paintings, French naturalism and realism, and themes from the 17th century Dutch masters. It's also nicknamed the 'Grey School' for heavy use of grey tones in many of their paintings. Similarly to the French Realists, they disregarded Romanticism and objectively painted the ordinary, though with less focus on human plights.

Willem Roelofs and Anton Mauve painted rural landscapes, Hendrik Willem Mesdag is known for seascapes and fishing boats, and Jacob Maris painted villages and waterways. Of all the work in the Hague School, scholars consider Jozef Israëls's Realist paintings to be the most comparable to Gustave Courbet's and Jean-Francois Millet's work, often depicting peasants and laboring. Vincent Van Gogh was instructed by Mauve and originally painted in the Realist style until he visited Paris in 1886 and was influenced by Impressionist artworks.

=== United Kingdom ===
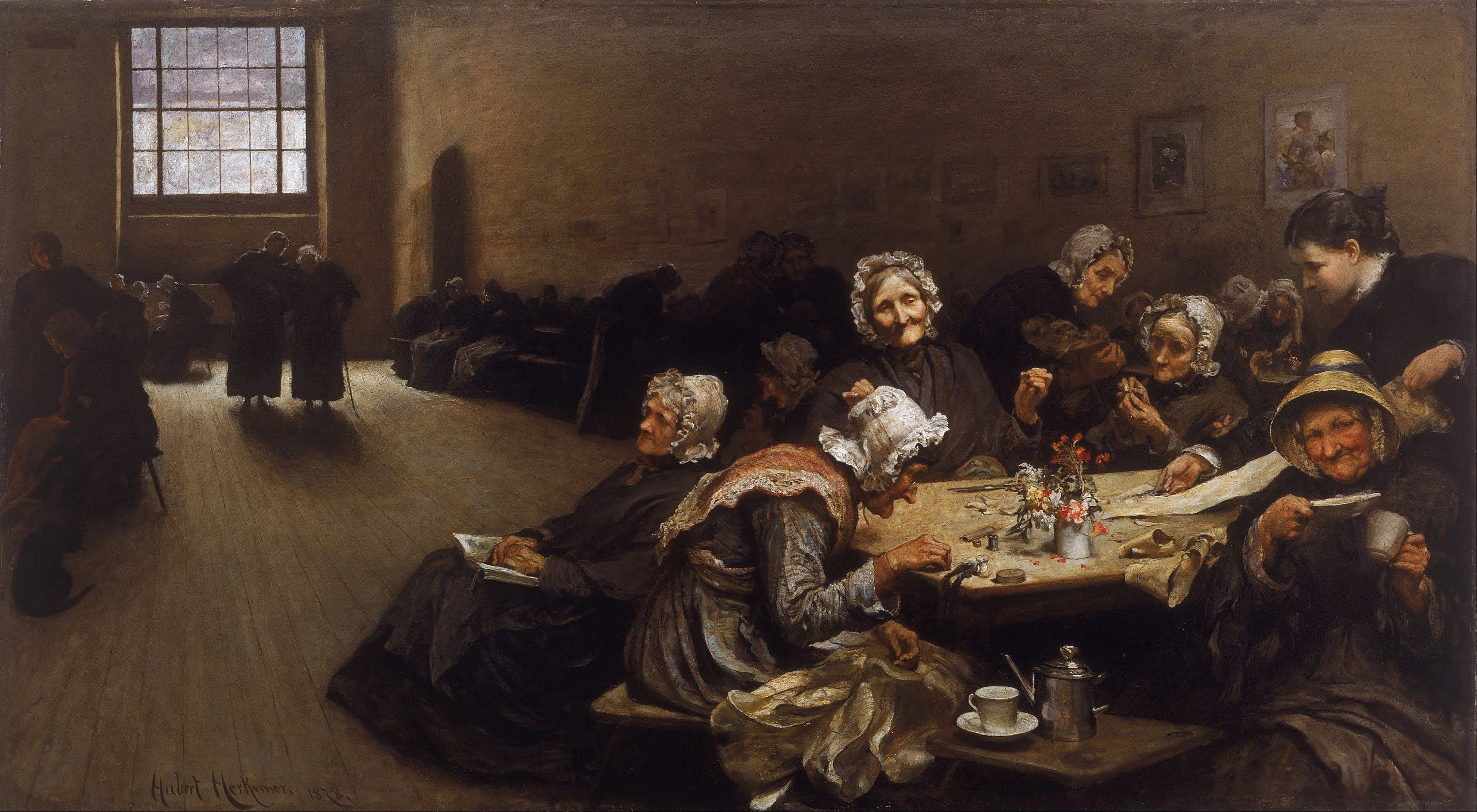
Hubert von Herkomer, Eventide: A Scene at the Westminster Union (1878)

Hubert von Herkomer, Luke Fildes, and Frank Holl comprised the unofficial British social realism school starting in the 1870s. They worked together at The Graphic from 1872-1876, producing woodcut images for the illustrated newspaper, drawing attention to social issues and poverty in the United Kingdom. The German-born Herkomer admired Menzel's woodcut prints and artwork, which show influence in Herkomer's prints for The Graphic. After their early career in prints, Herkomer, Fildes, and Holl moved to paintings, portraying objective depictions of poor and laboring people while also conversely, painting portraits for British nobility. Active a decade earlier, Frederick Walker had a similar trajectory from printing to Realist painting and was influential on Herkomer's work and other British artists in the later 19th century.

Despite being an original tenant of the Pre-Raphaelite Brotherhood, modern scholars are unconvinced that they can be called Realists. Like the French and Russian Realists, the Pre-Raphaelites rejected the academy in the mid-1800s and sought to objectively portray nature, but it's argued their artwork appears more emotional and reminiscent of Romanticism and the Nazarene movement. Later in his career, the Pre-Raphaelite Ford Maddox Brown's work was more traditionally Realist, as exemplified in Work (1855, 1863) and The Last of England (1852-5).

=== United States ===
Robert Henri, Snow in New York (1902)

Realism influenced American artists studying in Paris and Munich in the 1860s and 1870s. Two early American Realists, Winslow Homer and Thomas Eakins, spent time in Paris in 1867 and 1866–69, respectively. Homer's initial artwork consisted of Civil War camp and peasant paintings in the Realist style, though he transitioned to a more Romantic style later in life, depicting coastal cities and nature. Eakins worked on Realist style portraits and outside scenes, especially rowers on the water. American artists studying at the Academy of Fine Arts in Munich in the 1870s were taught by Karl von Piloty, who was proponent of Realism, but applied to history painting. These students included Frank Duveneck, William Merritt Chase, and Frank Currier, who were also members of the Realist Leibl Circle.

A later wave of American Realism occurred with the Ashcan School in New York City in the 1890s, depicting urban scenes and laborers in their artwork. Their leader, Robert Henri, attended the Pennsylvania Academy of Fine Art in 1886, where the teaching was heavily influenced by Thomas Eakins' Realist style, though Eakins was forced to resign just prior to Henri starting. After three years in Paris, he returned to the US and settled in New York, actively working against the mainstream academy and the Impressionist art movement. Other Realist members of the group include John Sloan, William Glackens, Everett Shinn, and George Luks. Similarly to Menzel and the British social Realists, all four also began their careers as newspaper print illustrators.

== Gallery ==
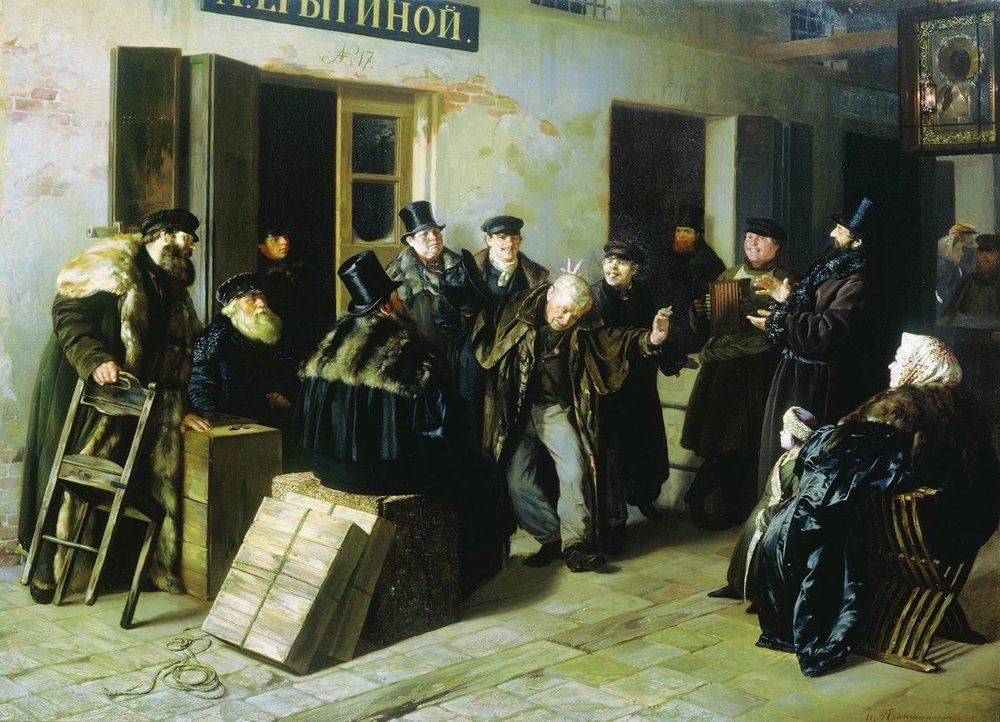
Illarion Pryanishnikov, Jokers (1865). Gostiny Dvor in Moscow

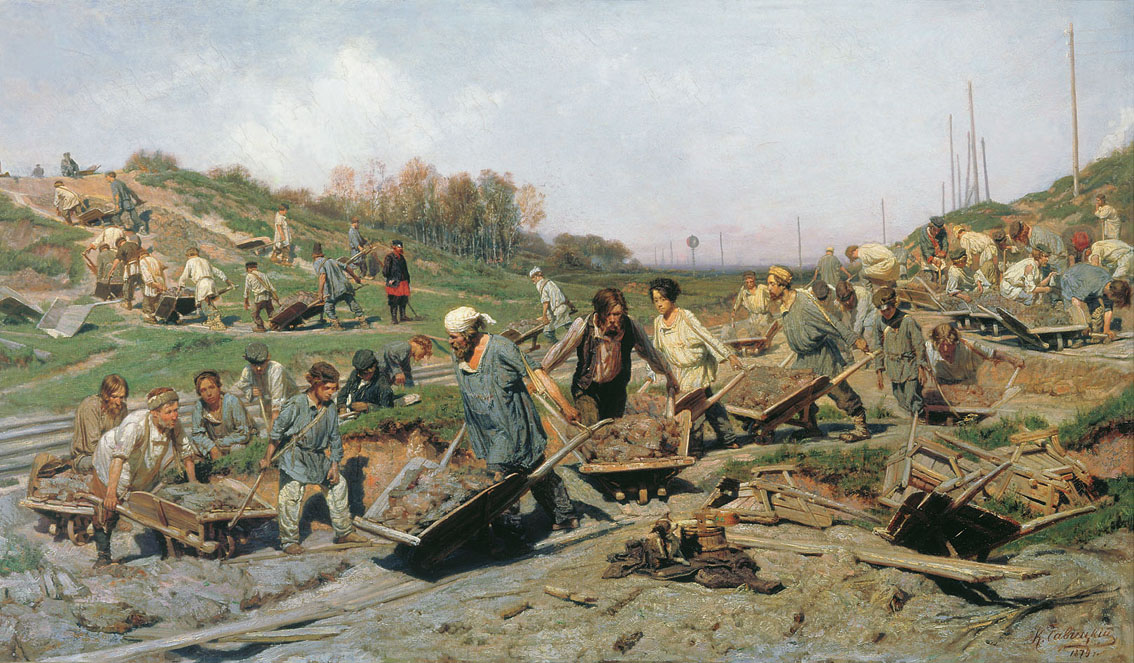
Konstantin Savitsky, Repairing the Railway (1874)

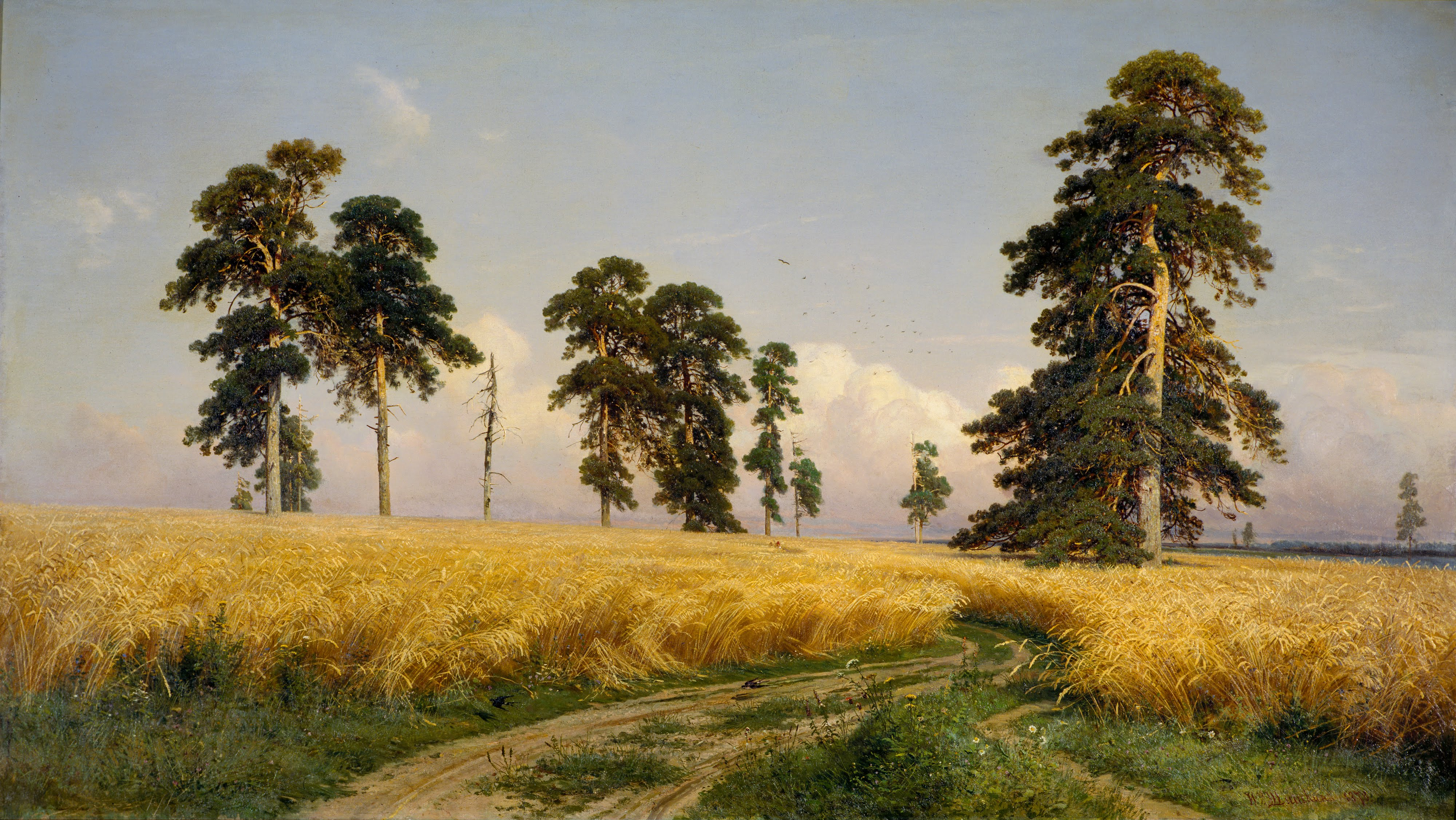
Ivan Shishkin, A Rye Field (1878)

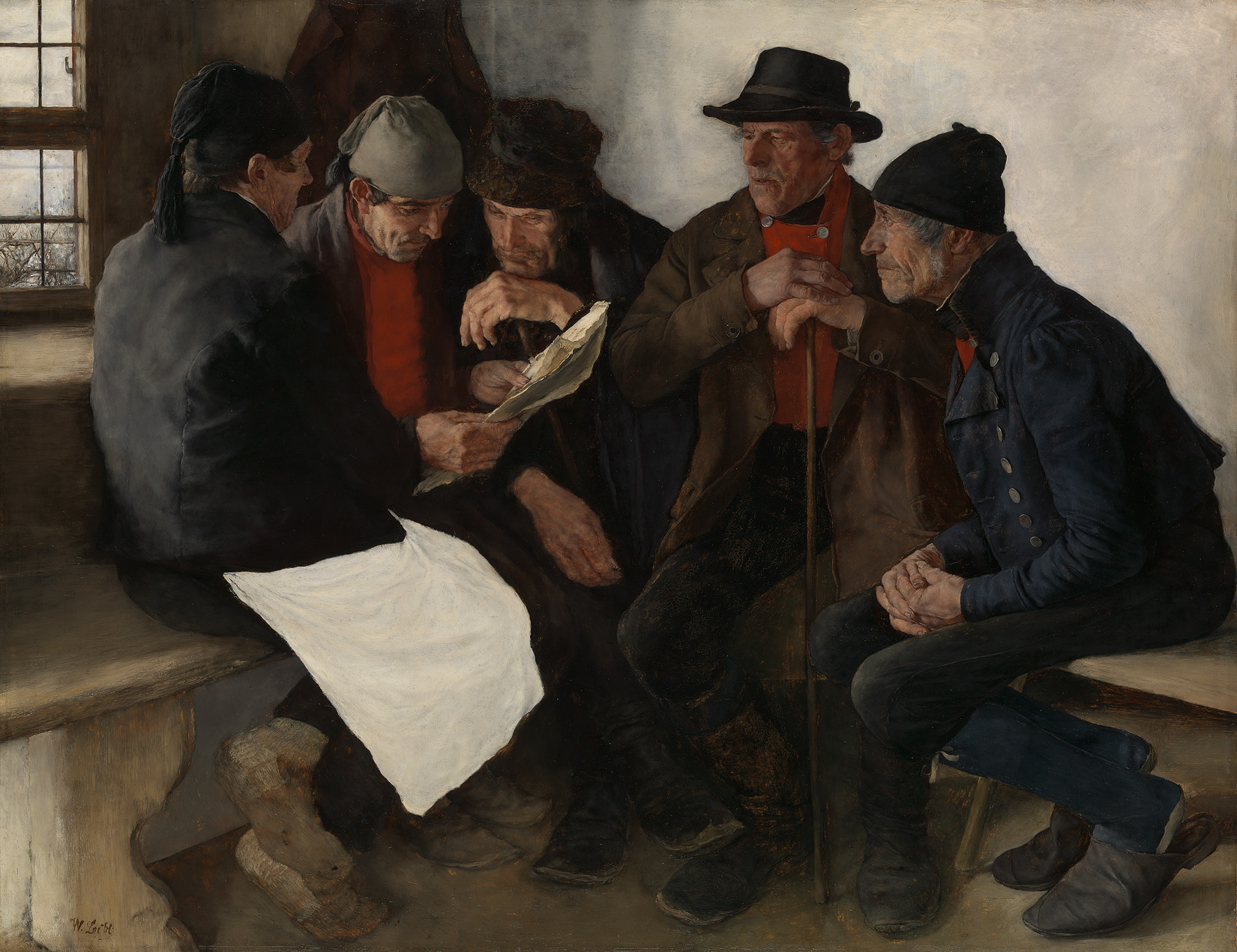
Wilhelm Leibl, The Village Politicians (1877)

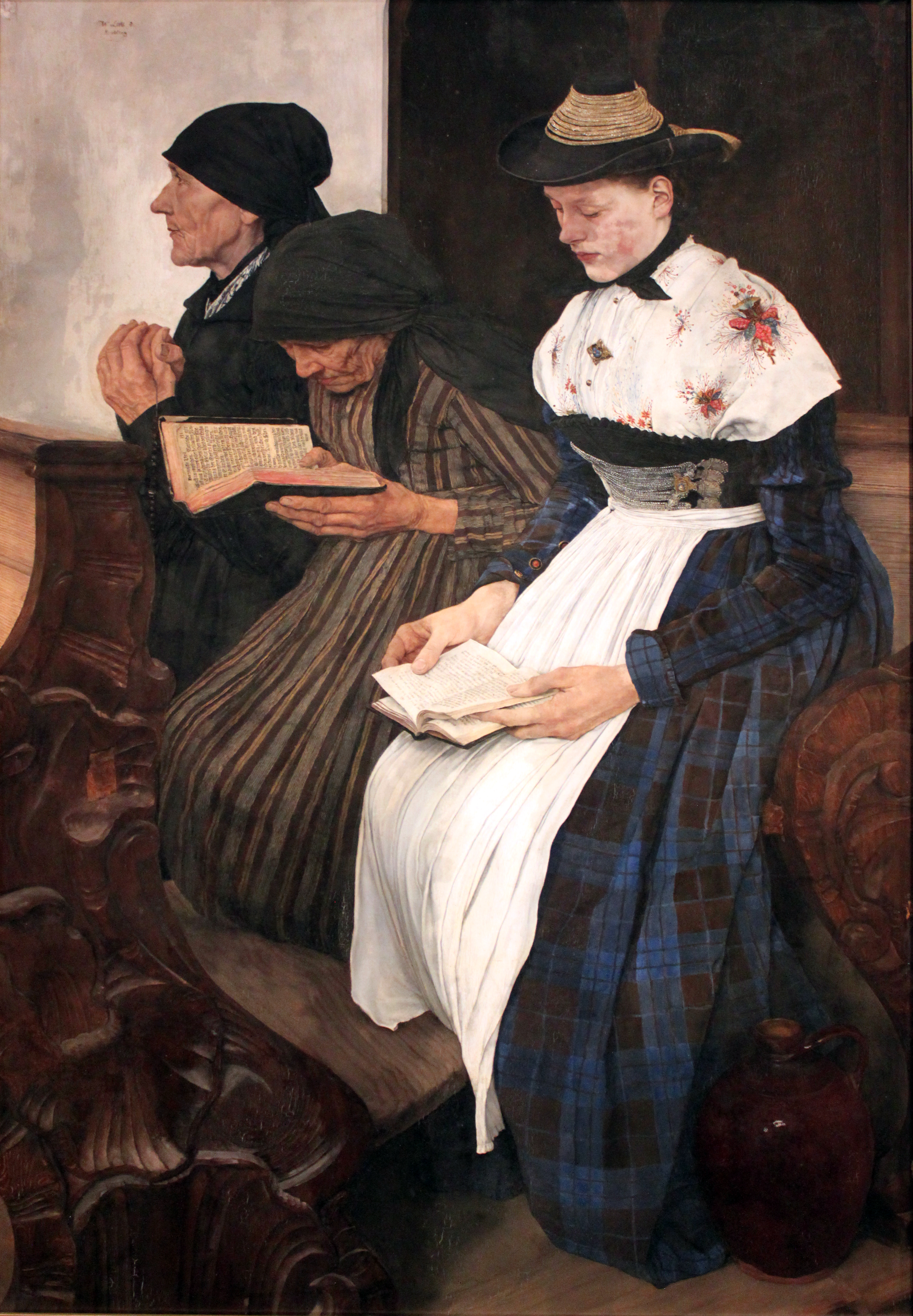
Wilhelm Leibl, Three Women in Church (1881)

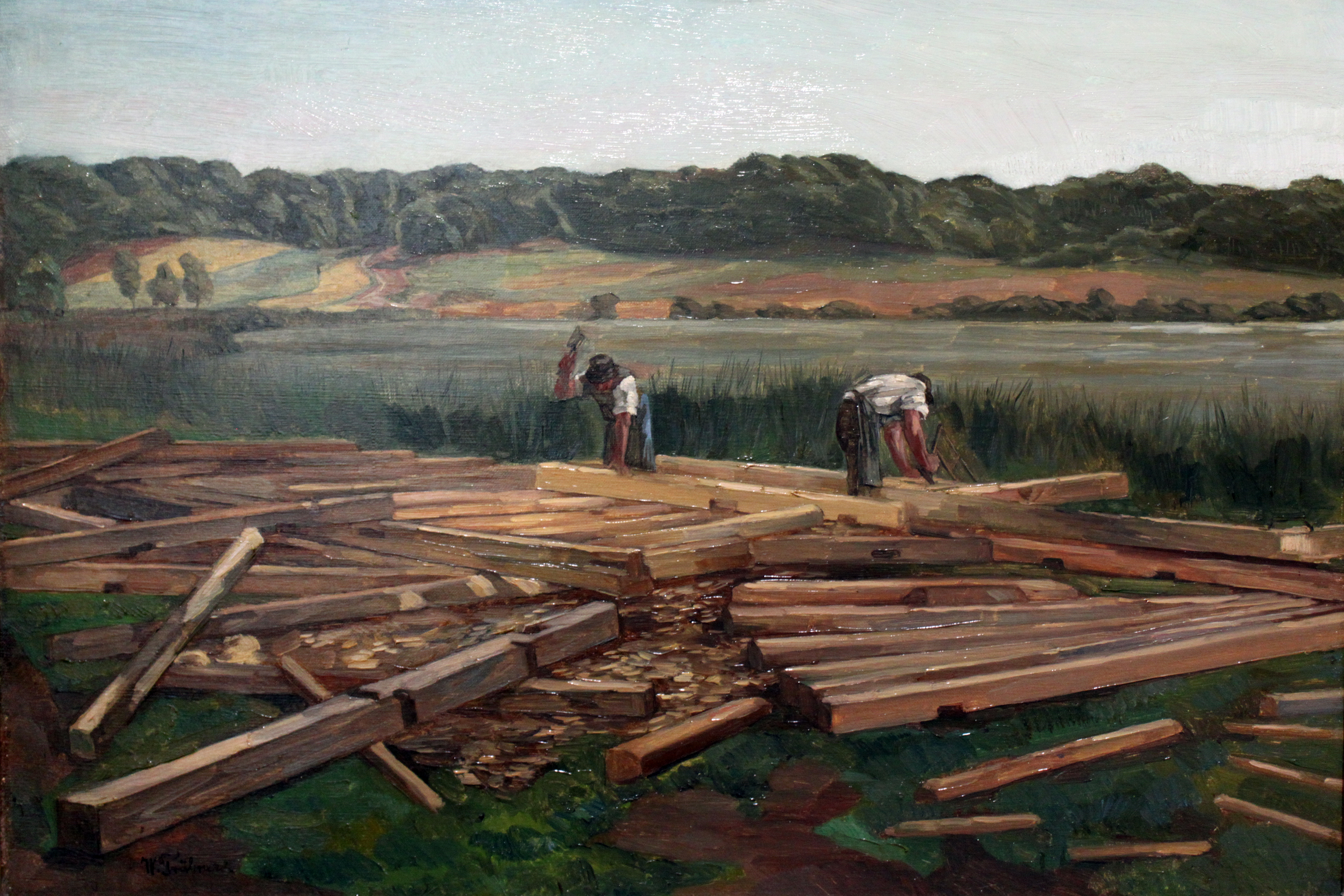
Wilhelm Trübner, Carpenters on the Bank of Wessling Lake (1876)

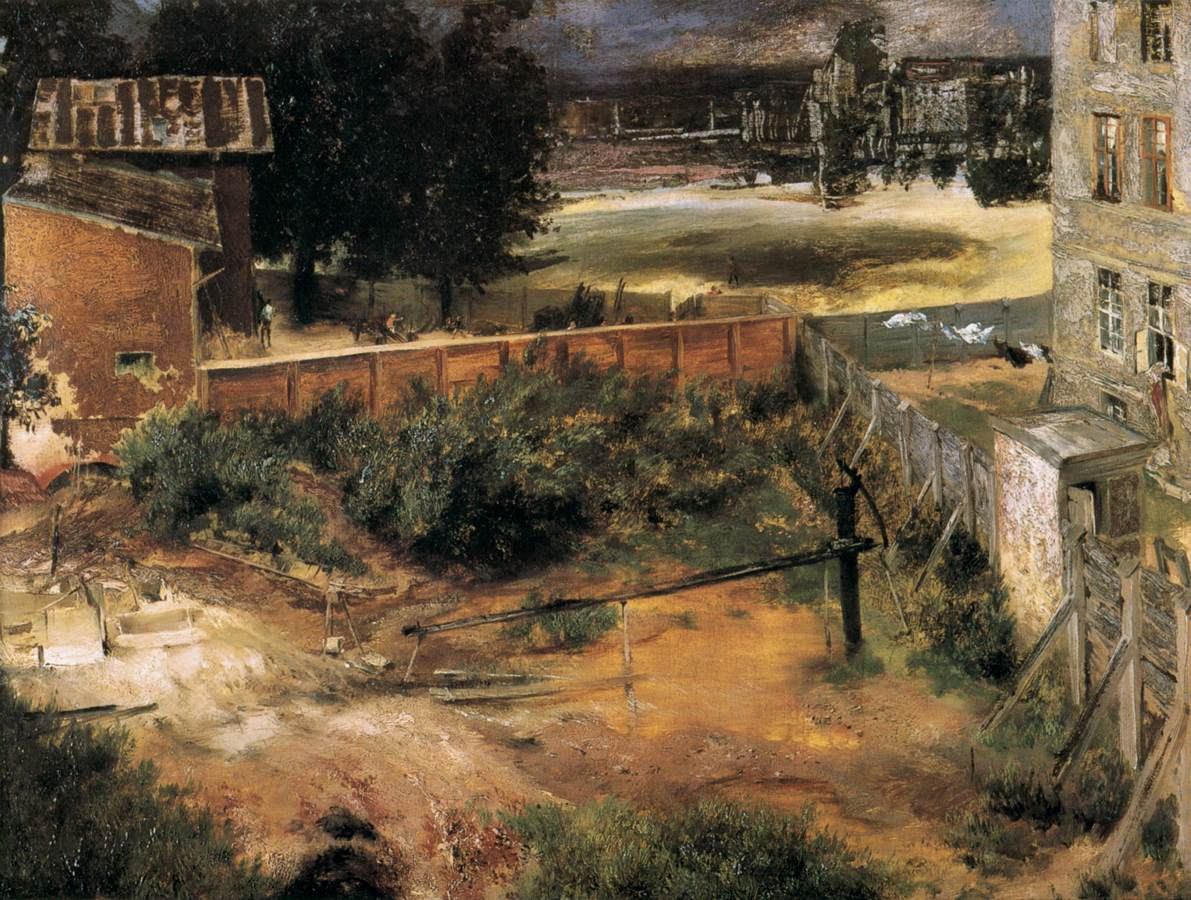
Adolph Menzel, Rear of House and Backyard (1846)

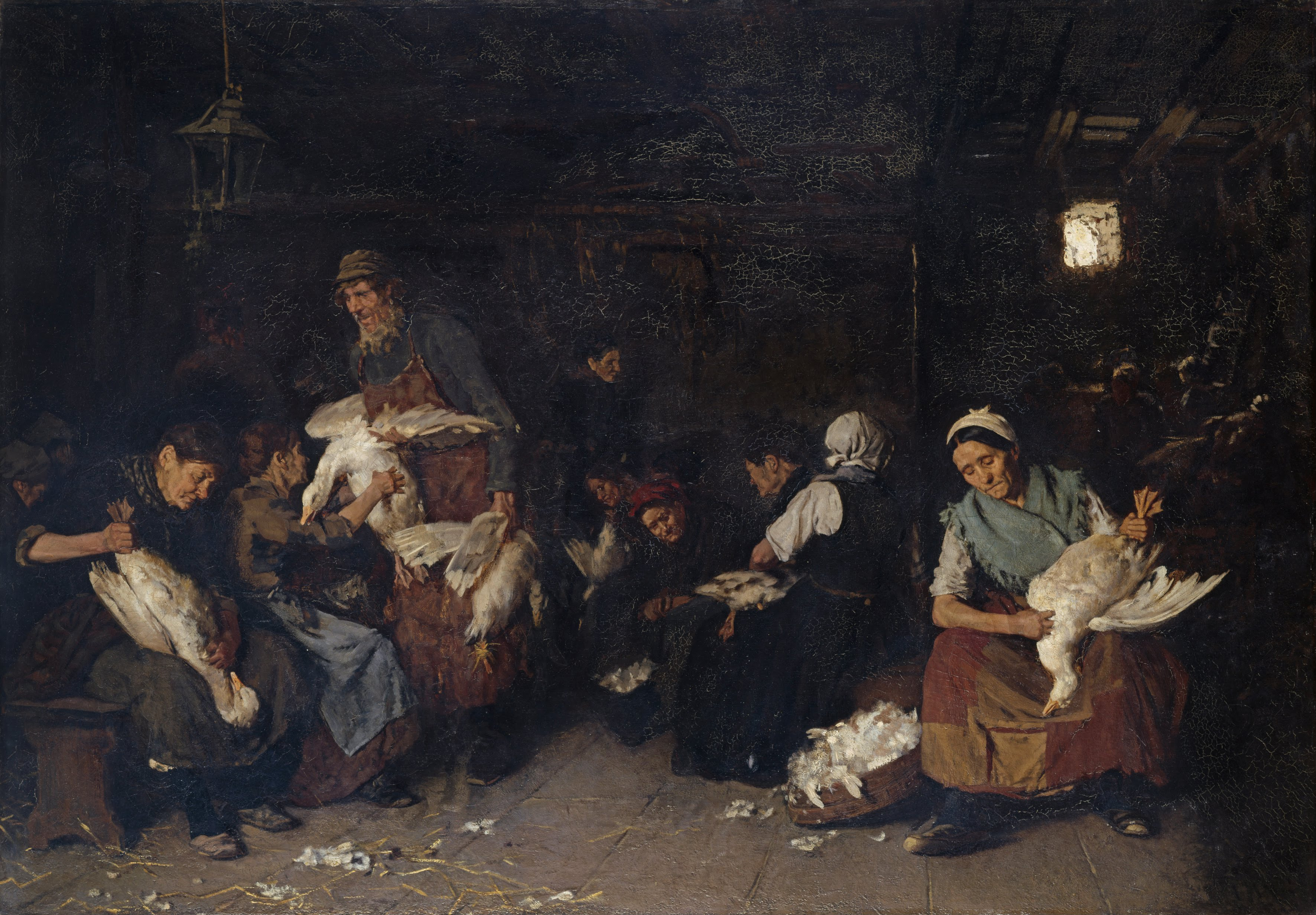
Max Liebermann, Women Plucking Geese (1872)

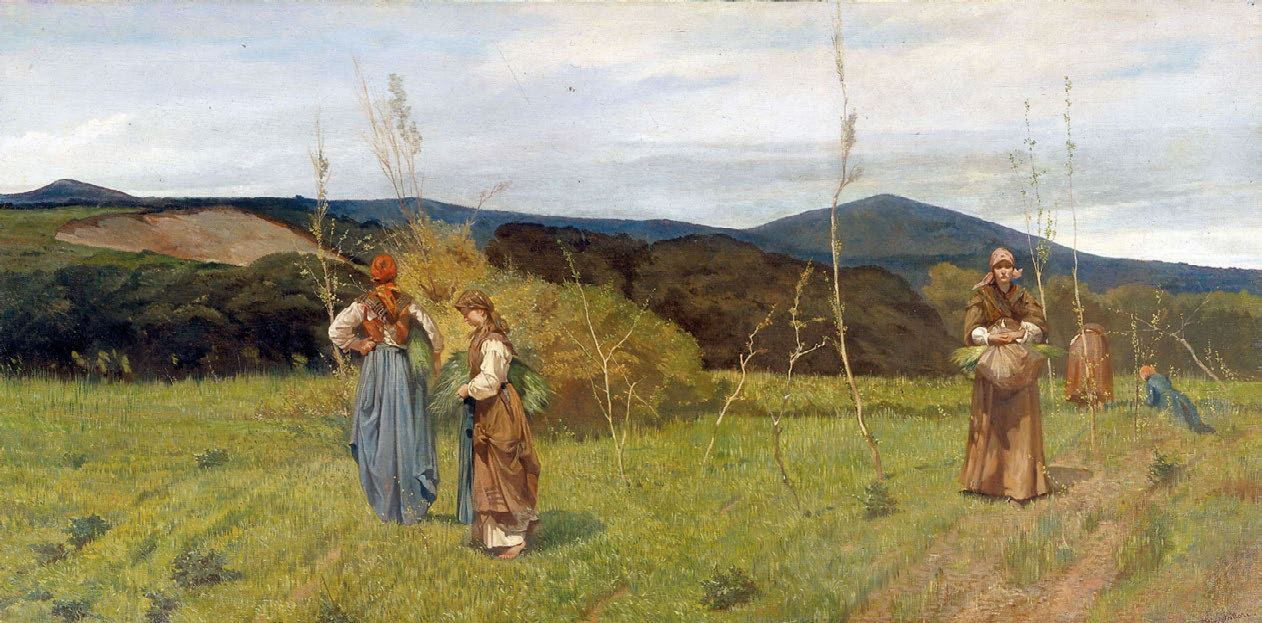
Giovanni Fattori, Three Peasants in a Field (1866–67)

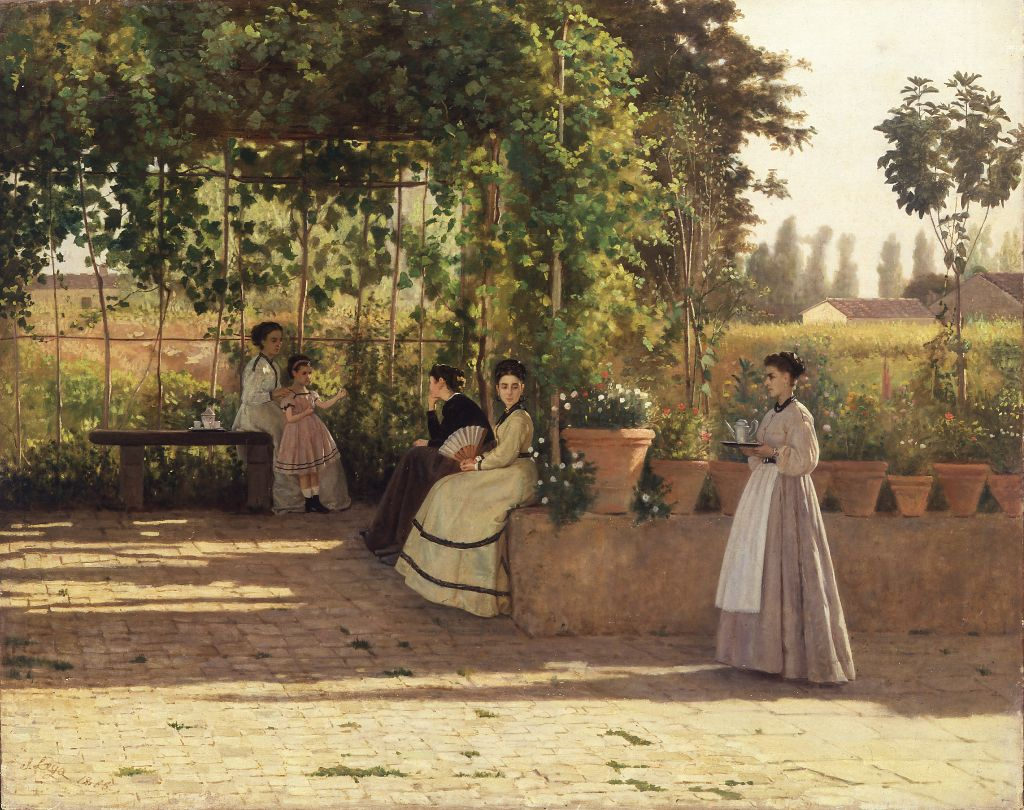
Silvestro Lega, La Pergola (1868)

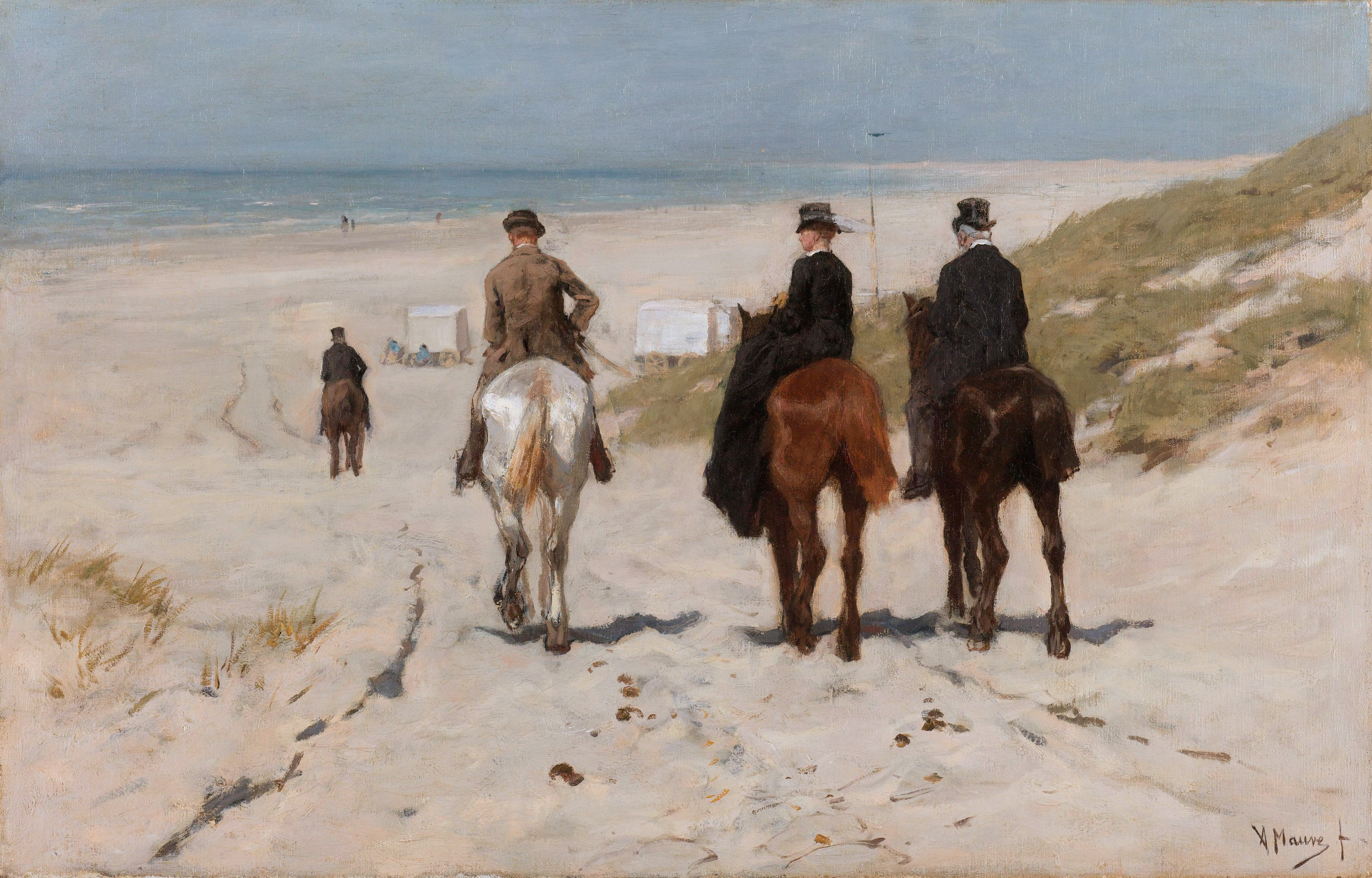
Anton Mauve, Morning Ride on the Beach (1876)

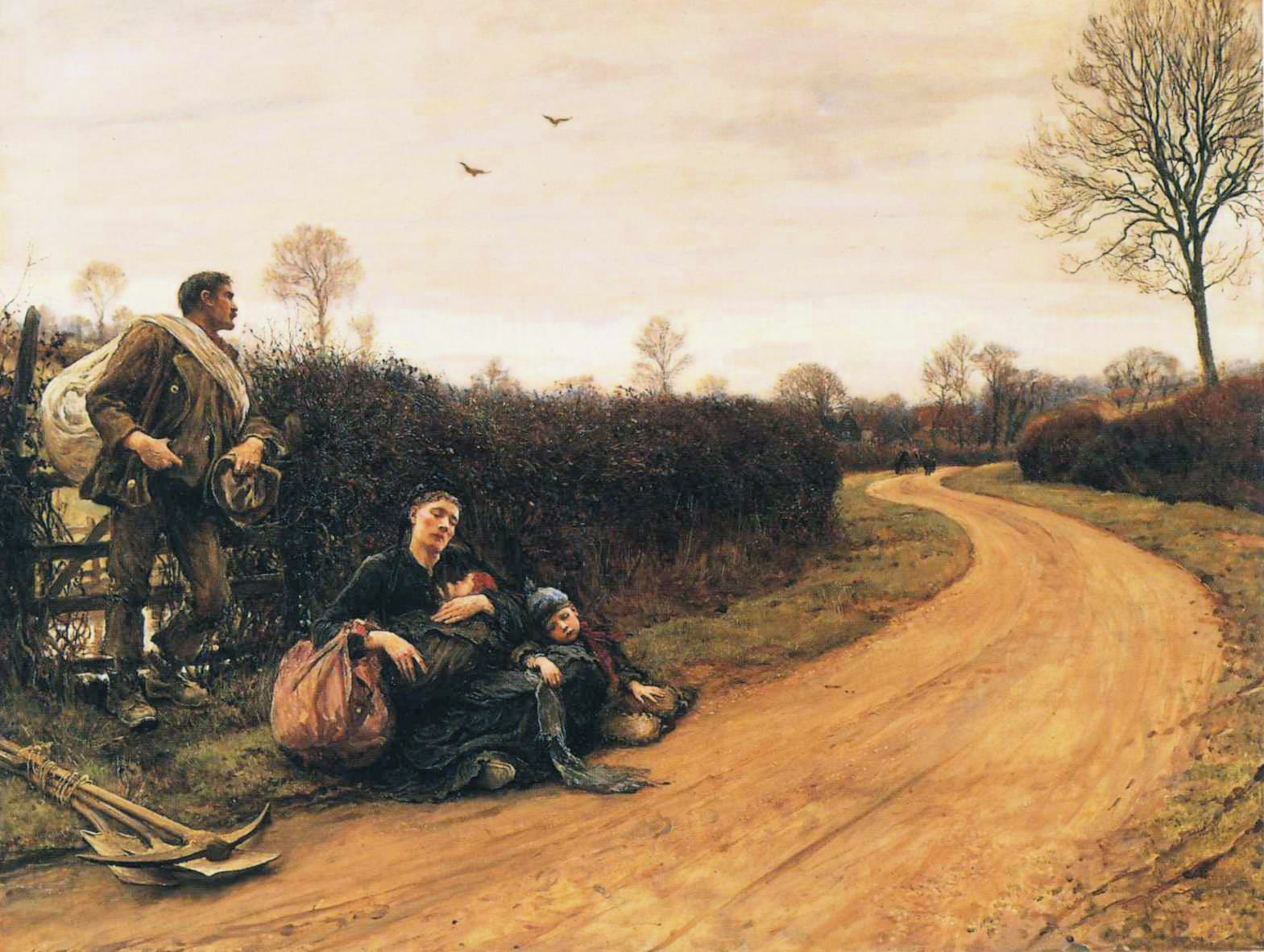
Hubert von Herkomer, Hard Times (1885)

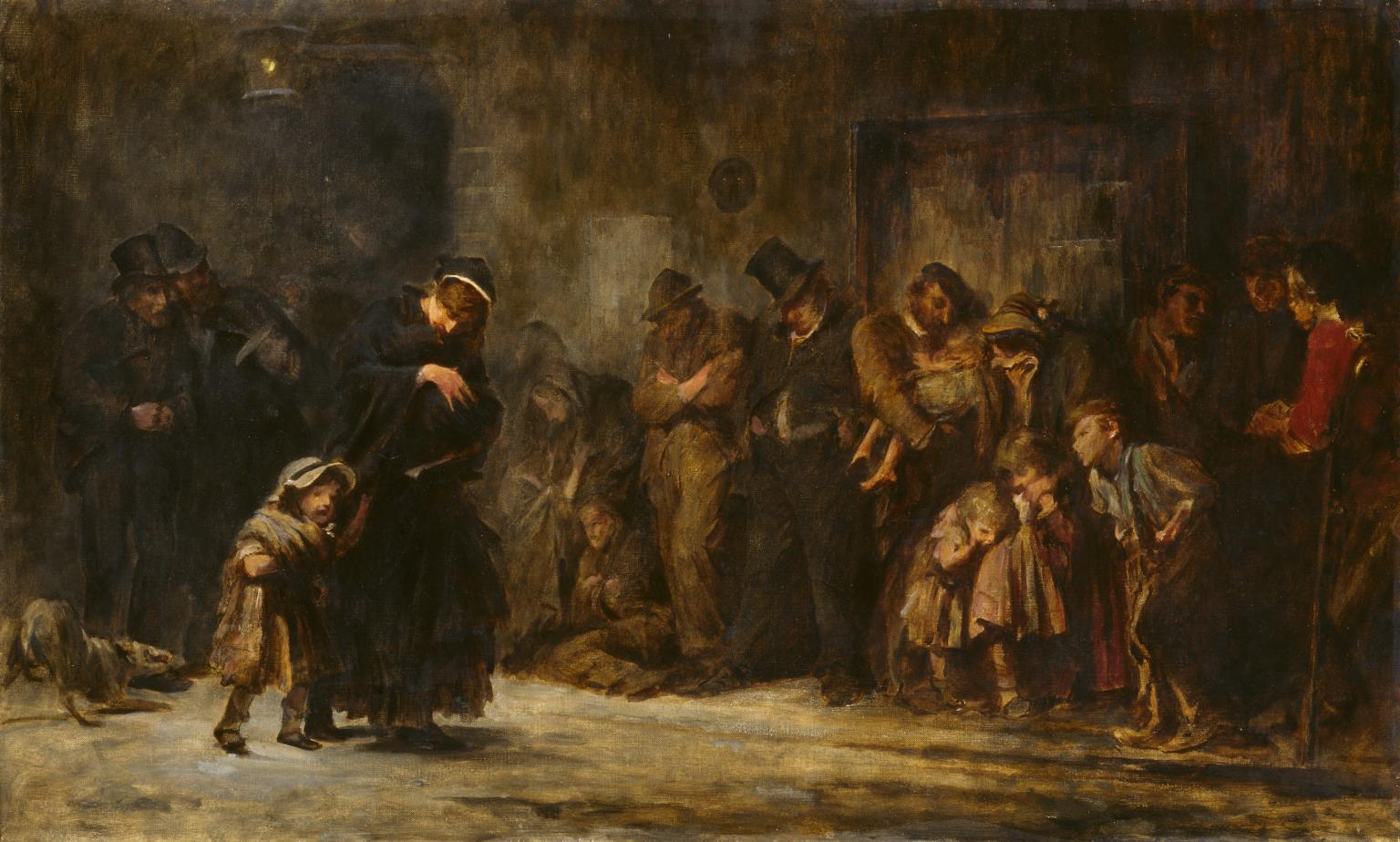
Luke Fildes, Applicants for Admission to a Casual Ward (1874)

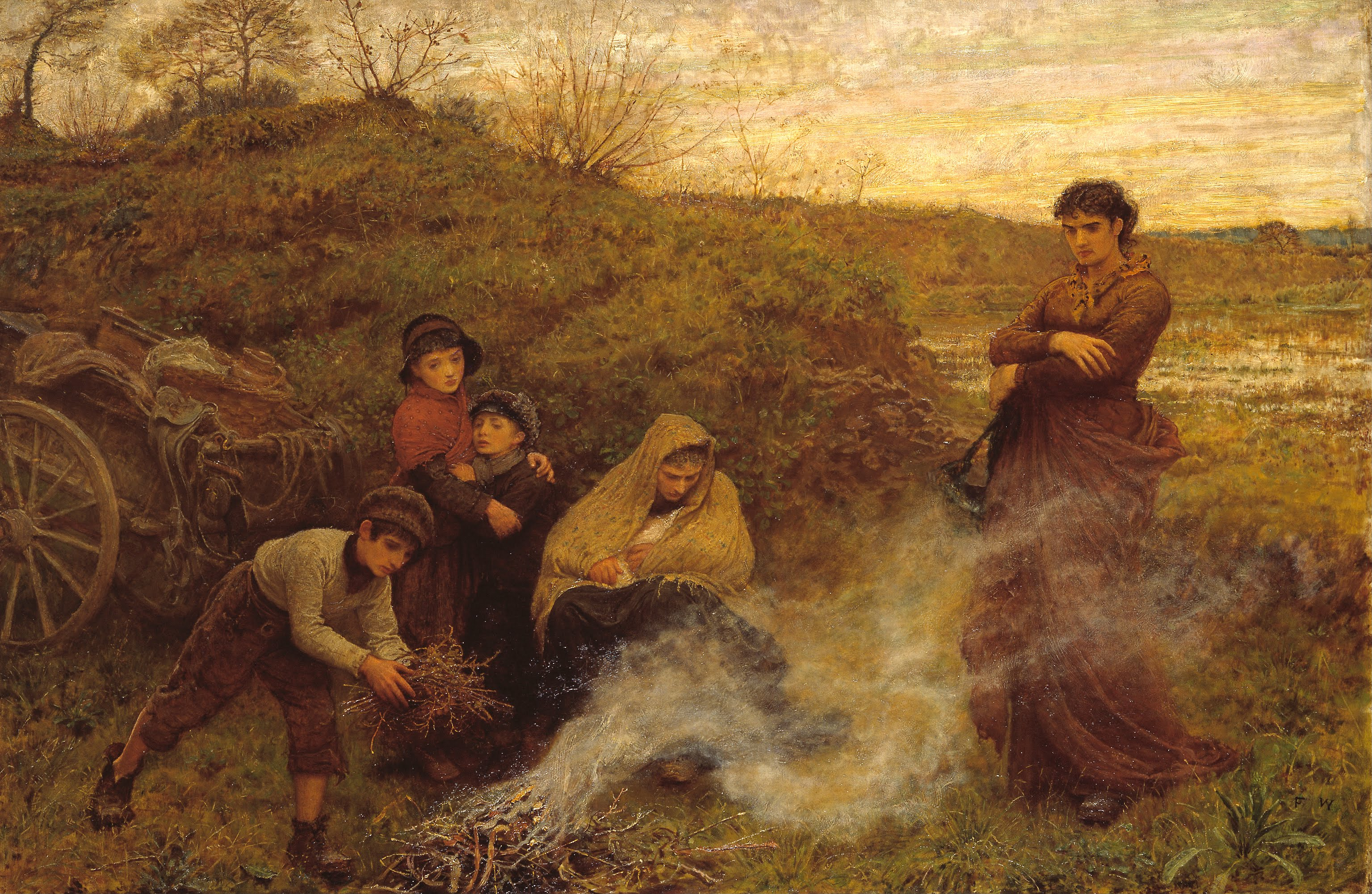
Frederick Walker, The Vagrants (1868)

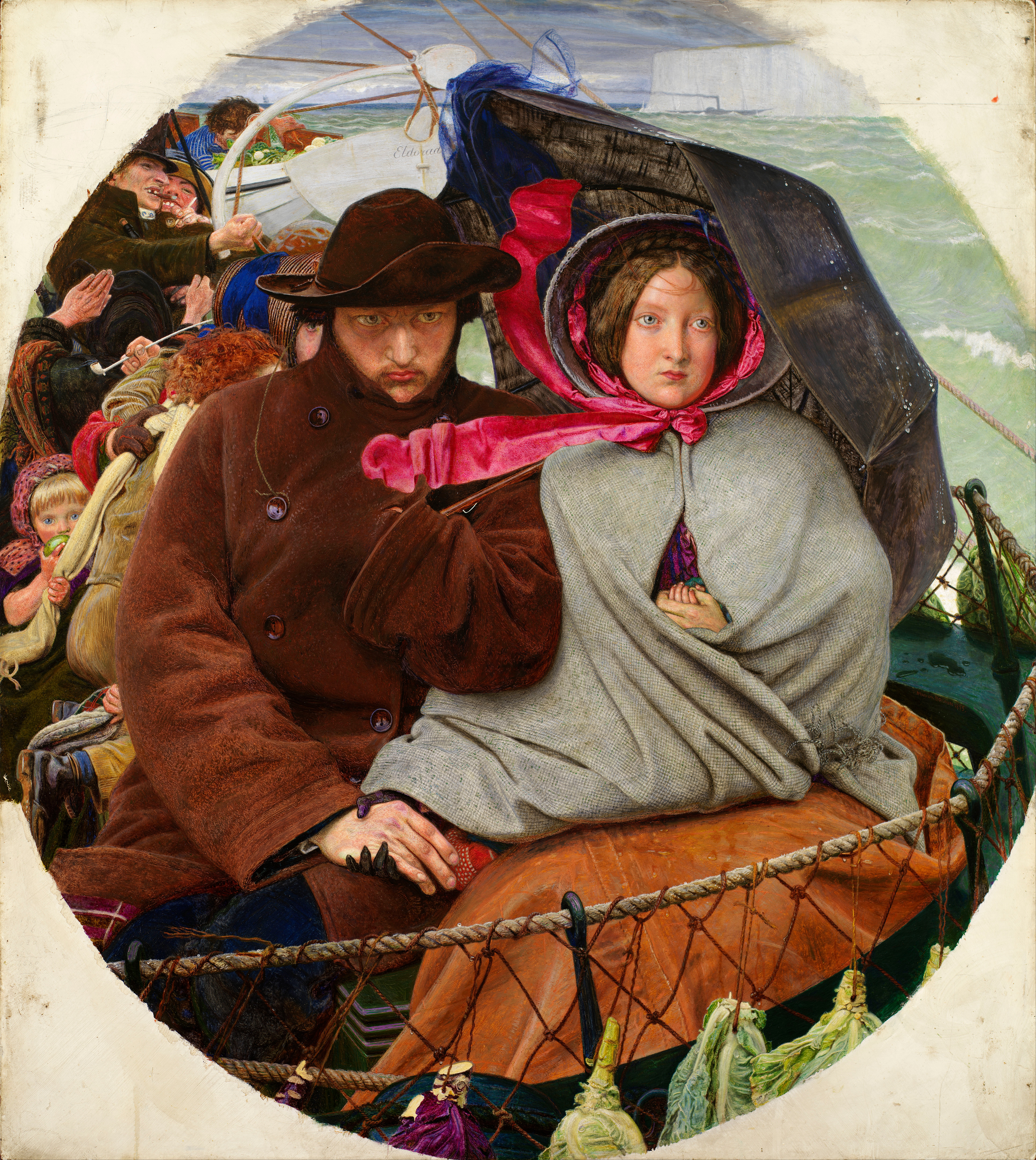
Ford Madox Brown, The Last of England (1852–1855)

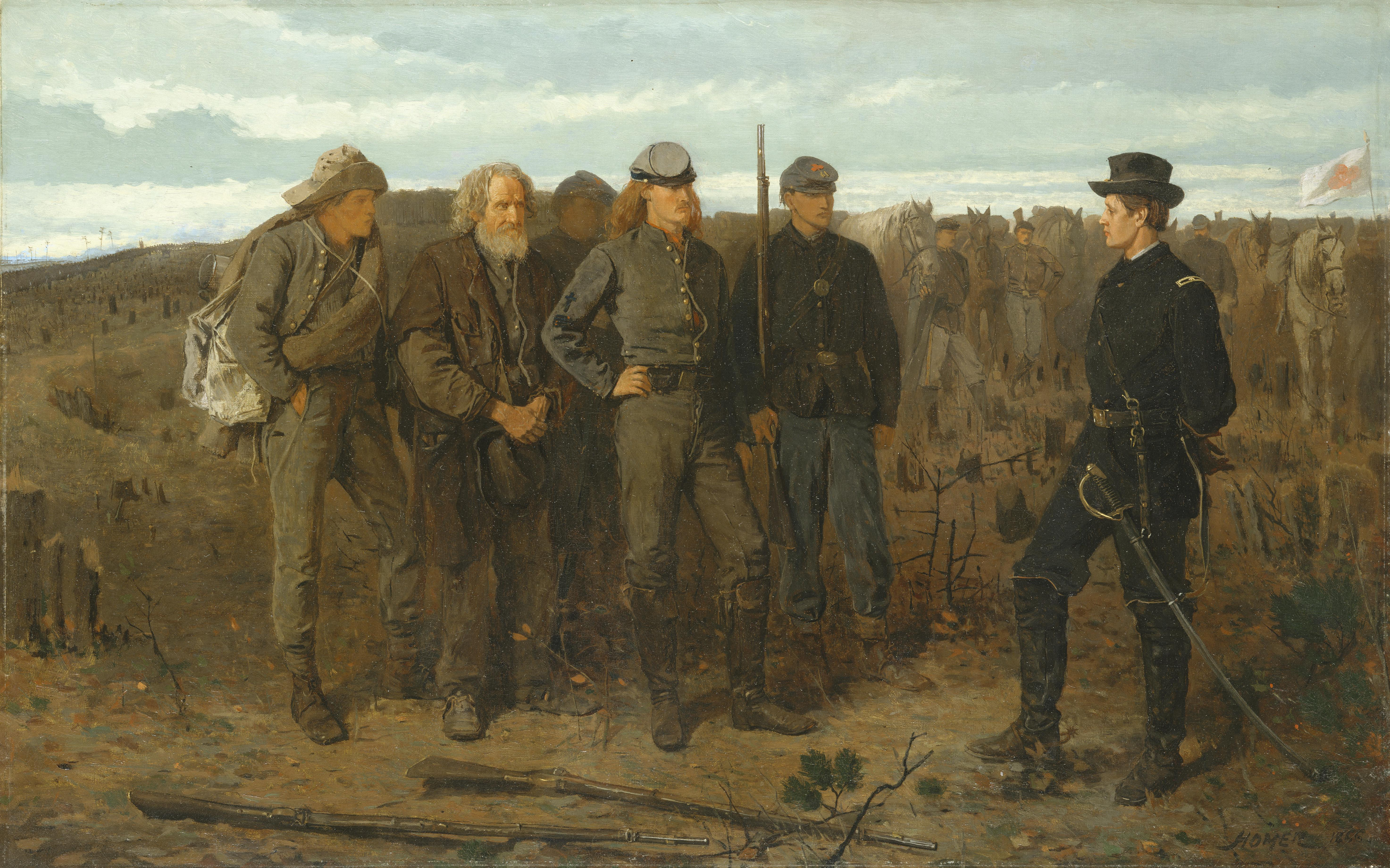
Winslow Homer, Prisoners from the Front (1866)

Everett Shinn, Cross Streets of New York1899). Corcoran Gallery of Art, Washington DC

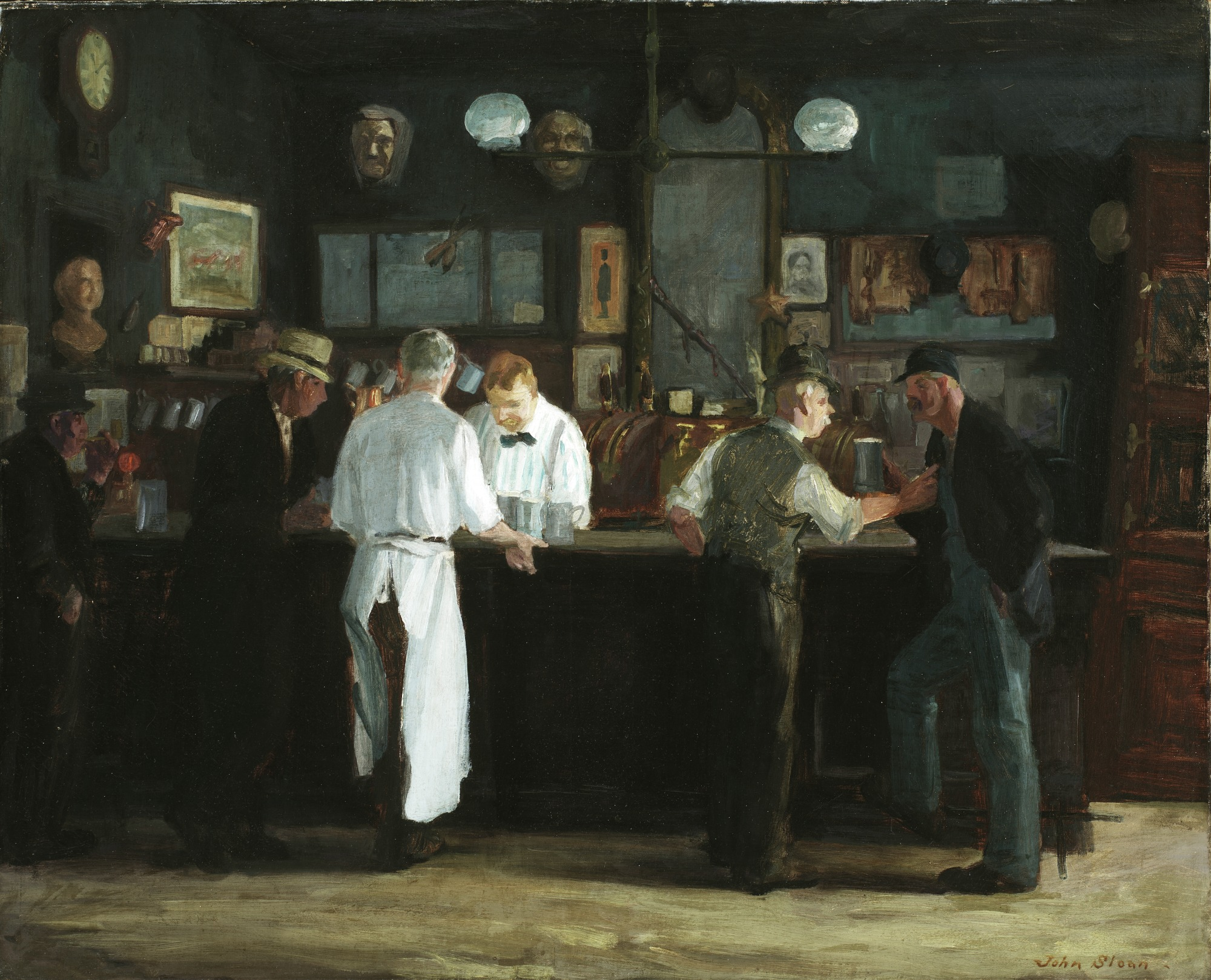
John French Sloan, McSorley's Bar (1912). Detroit Institute of Arts

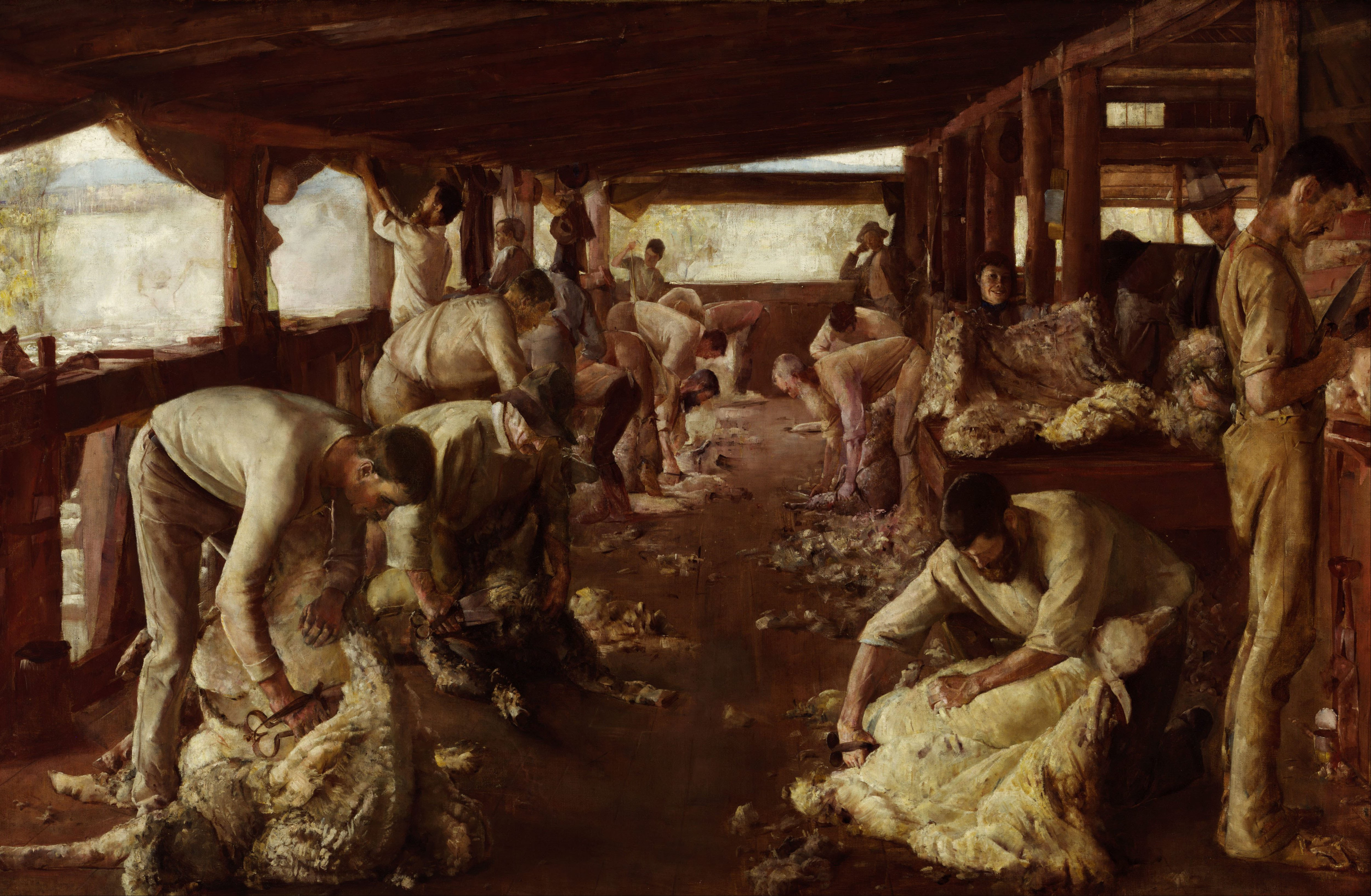
Tom Roberts, The Golden Fleece (1894).

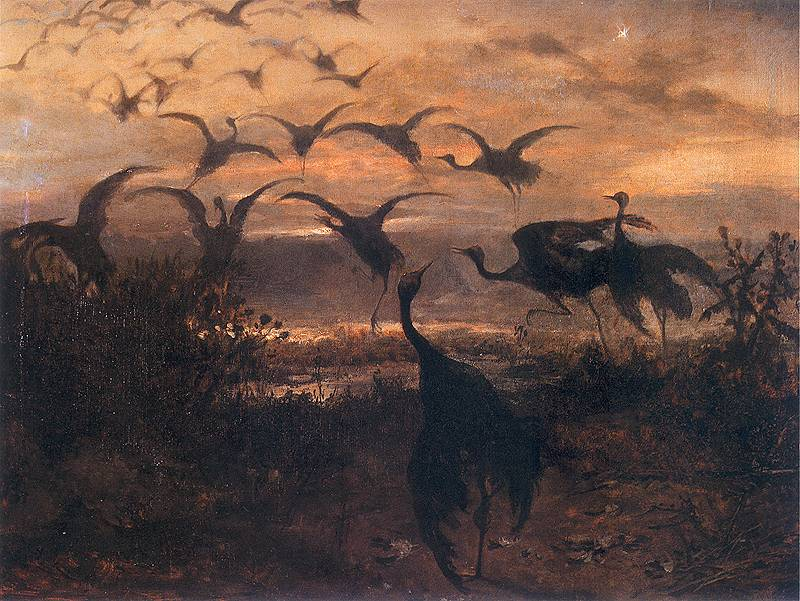
Józef Chełmoński, Departing Cranes (1871). National Museum in Kraków
