= The Iron Rolling Mill (Modern Cyclopes) =

Painting by Adolph Menzel

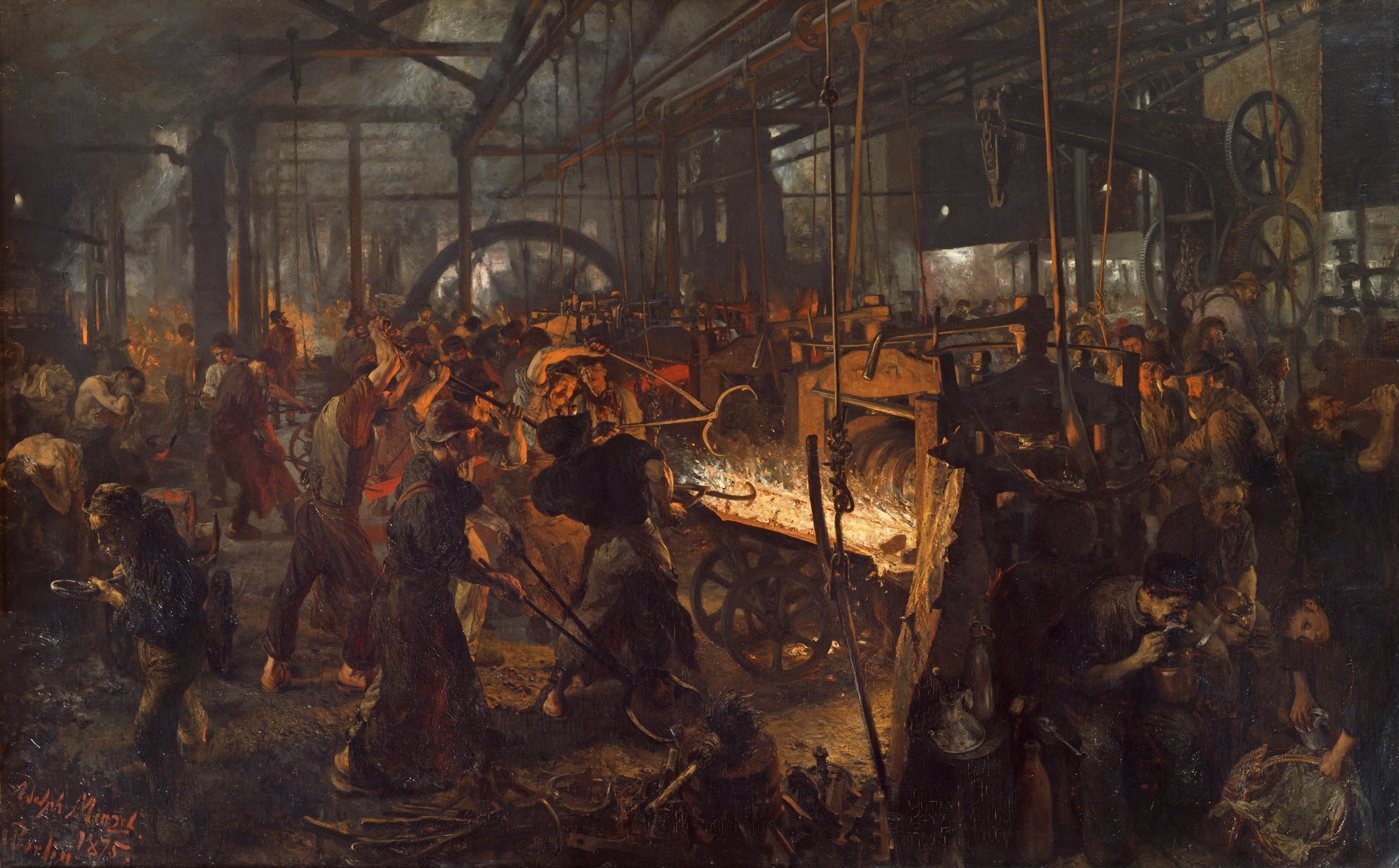
- Artist: Adolph Menzel
- Year: 1872-1875
- Medium: oil on canvas
- Dimensions: 158 cm × 254 cm (62 in × 100 in)
- Location: Alte Nationalgalerie, Berlin

The Iron Rolling Mill (Modern Cyclopes) is an oil on canvas painting by German artist Adolph Menzel, created in 1872-1875. The painting is one of his main works from the time when the painter was mostly concerned with contemporary issues and the social question as a result of the uninhibited technical advances made during the Industrial Revolution, particularly in Germany. It has the large dimensions of 158 by 254 cm. The signature of the artist can be seen at the lower left: "Signatur Adolph Menzel. Berlin 1875". The realistic painting caused a stir at the time and is now part of the collection of the Alte Nationalgalerie, in Berlin.

== Preliminary studies ==
There are over 100 penciled preliminary studies for the painting in the Kupferstichkabinett Berlin. Movement studies show the individual work steps of steel processing in the rolling mill, as well as overall views of the blast furnace plant in different lights, individual machines and tools. Menzel also created a gouache titled Self-portrait with a worker at the steam hammer (Leipzig, Museum of Fine Arts, no. 1972/6), where he sketches the man at the steam hammer in the background of a machine shop. The final painting was created in the studio with the help of models for the different postures. The publisher Wilhelm Spemann wrote about this work: "In this description of the iron rail forge from Königshütte in Upper Silesia, the highest degree of naturalistic observation is combined with virtuosity of presentation and a strong feeling for painterly effect. The scientific accuracy of the description cannot be pushed any further, the liveliness of the expression cannot be increased. There are numerous drawn studies that Menzel made for this picture of modern cyclops, in the work itself the drawing recedes behind the mastery with which the tremendous difficulties of air and light painting have been overcome.”

== Description ==
The work shows the factory building of the Oberschlesische Königshütte, a rolling mill for railroad tracks, which was privately owned by Carl Justus Heckmann, after several mergers in 1871 and employed around 3000 workers at the time. In the smoky factory building, more than 40 workers can be seen, after just having a shift change. Some of the workers at the furnace, barefoot in clogs and without protective gloves, transport the white-hot so-called slug with tongs and by tipping an iron hand truck into the profile rollers.

On the right edge of the picture is a hand-operated crane with gear transmission and chain hoist. In the front lower right margin, exhausted workers are seated next to a press, having a lunch break, eating a meal brought in a basket by a young woman. The people are mostly concentrated on their own activities; only the young woman next to the eating workers seems to be looking directly at the viewer. Men can also be seen on the left washing themselves bare-chested at the end of their shift.

In the upper left half of the painting there is a man with a coat and bowler hat, who strolls through this hall apparently uninvolved and directs his gaze to the upper part of a puddling furnace above the flywheel as the power source of the press. Menzel himself referred to him as a "conductor". The German art historian Werner Busch wrote about this: “But the vanishing point itself is noted very specifically in the iron rolling mill, it is found in the conductor's head. As far as he is in the background, not only do the lines that shorten run towards him, but he differs from all the other personnel in two ways. He wears not work clothes but middle-class street clothes with 'bowler hat', his non-working hands clasped behind his back, strolling through the hall while the workers are tense in every way.”

== Provenance ==
The painting was bought in 1875 by the customer, the banker Adolph von Liebermann, for 11,000 thalers, but in November, after Liebermann went bankrupt, it was sold to the Berlin National Gallery for 30,000 thalers, under director Max Jordan, who, due to the high price, sent a request for purchase to the Prussian Ministry of Culture, describing the work in his letter as a "moving work of heroism and duty", a new type of "historical painting with a moral effect" and as "glorification of the rough work of modern cultural life".
