= The Balcony Room =

Painting by Adolph Menzel

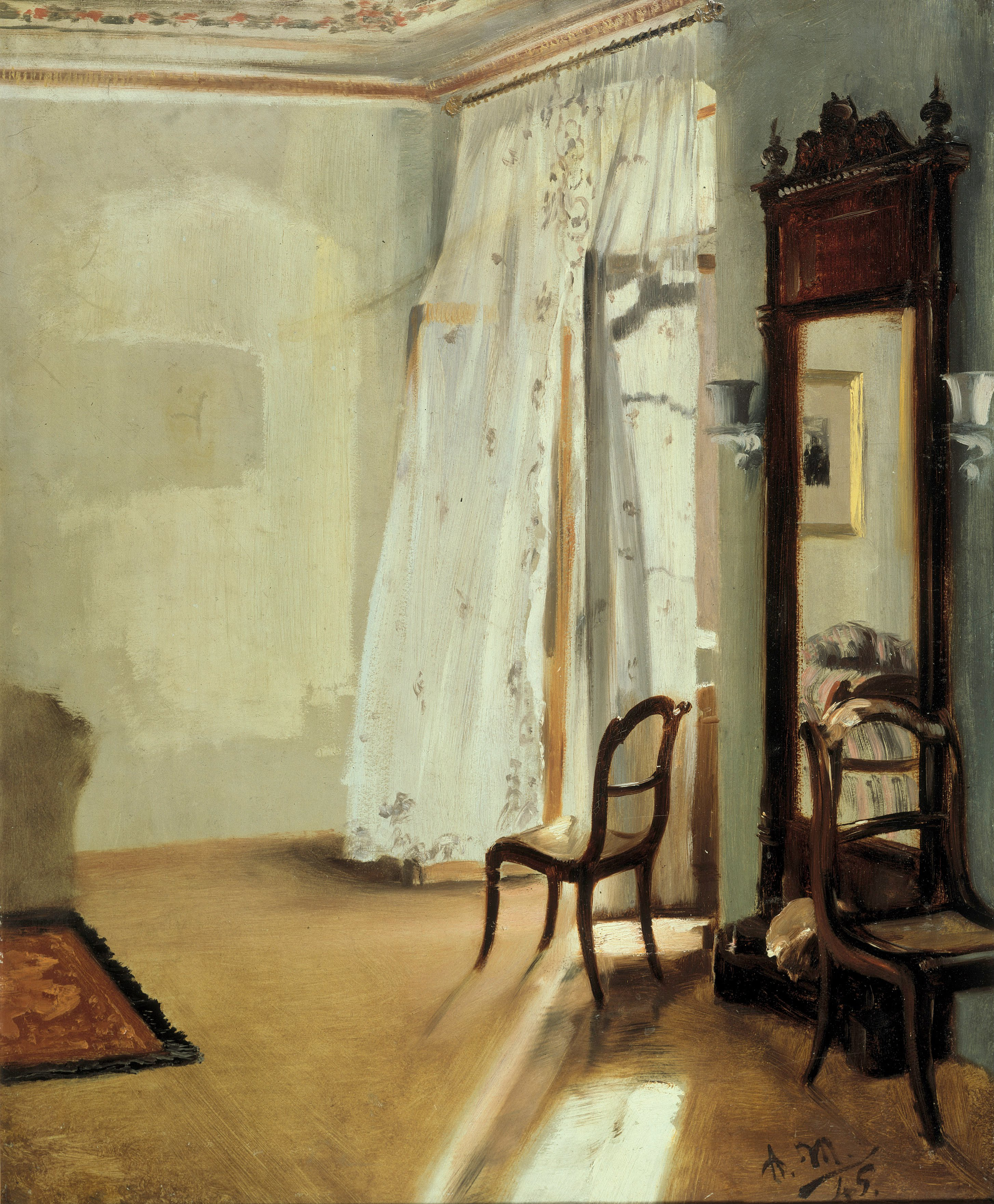
- Artist: Adolph Menzel
- Year: 1845
- Medium: oil on canvas
- Dimensions: 58 cm × 47 cm (23 in × 19 in)
- Location: Alte Nationalgalerie, Berlin

The Balcony Room is an oil-on-canvas painting by the German artist Adolph Menzel, executed in 1845. It is one of the main works of his early period and one of his most famous paintings. It has belonged to the collection of the Alte Nationalgalerie in Berlin, since 1903.

== History ==
Menzel painted numerous paintings of interior views until 1848. This room belonged to the Menzel family's apartment on Schöneberger Strasse, at the time on the south-eastern outskirts of Berlin, where the artist lived with his mother and siblings. During this time he also made the illustrations for the multi-volume history of Frederick the Great by Franz Theodor Kugler (until 1842), which marked his artistic breakthrough. In Kugler's work, Menzel had already used the motif of a door letting light through in chapter 42. It is a woodcut of the round library in Sanssouci Palace, which shows the windows that reach down to the floor flooded with light. In addition to the picture from this apartment, Menzel made other pictures of the apartments in Ritterstrasse and Marienstraße.

== Description ==
The painting has the dimensions 58 by 47 cm and is executed using the painting technique of oil on canvas. Menzel's signature is on the lower right: AM / 45. The art dealer R. Wagner bought it from the artist in Berlin. In January 1903, two years before Menzel's death, Hugo von Tschudi acquired the picture as director of the Nationalgalerie. Since then it has had the inventory number AI 744.

The picture creates the atmosphere of a bourgeois apartment on a summer afternoon. The cool comfort of the room contrasts with the heat outside. The room is noticeably sparsely furnished or cleared out and is flooded with sunlight that penetrates through a white curtain. The curtain is slightly puffed, which suggests a weak gust of wind. In its emptiness, the room looks almost dull. It has just a few everyday pieces of furniture: a mirror, two arbitrarily placed chairs facing each other, a modest carpet and a dimly indicated sofa on the left edge of the painting, which appears more clearly in the mirror, are there. The room appears uncomfortable completely in contrast to the usual room paintings of the Biedermeier period that convey comfort, prosperity and a sense of style. It is deserted, carelessly furnished and unspectacularly usual. Nothing is staged or told here. In Menzel's representationally empty picture, the restrained colors alone appear independent, atmospherically fresh and lively. In particular, the incidence of light through the open balcony door gives the picture its enigmatic charm. The light illuminates the polished wooden floor and the wall mirror, which half reflects an indefinable gold-framed picture in the invisible area of the room above the sofa.

The wall, which takes up the entire left half of the picture, has a surface in a lighter color scheme with a recognizable structure of the paint application. Viewers asked themselves whether the picture was possibly unfinished there, whether it is a reflection of light or whether a new coat of paint on the wall has been interrupted. However, according to the art historian Claude Keisch, the composition of the left half of the picture with its shadowy sofa does not allow any “plasticity”.

== Reception ==
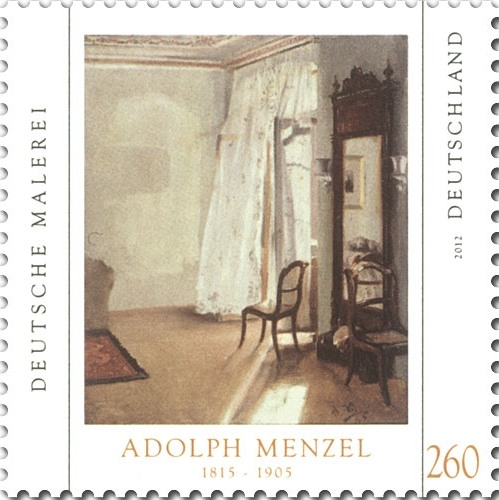
The Balcony Room on a German stamp (2012)

Art historian Lucius Grisebach believes the painting is unfinished, even though it is signed, and believes it is one of his private studies that were not intended for the public. The painting is to be understood as a kind of exercise in the use of light for his later official paintings, such as Frederick the Great Playing the Flute at Sanssouci (1852). These studies only became known in the last years of Menzel's life. Menzel's private painting aimed to capture an attractive situation with painterly means. In the private sphere, he anticipated what the French Impressionists, but also Max Liebermann, only later publicly represented.

== Cultural references ==
On 14 June 2012 the painting was issued for the stamp series “German Painting” as a 260 cents postage stamp named "Adolph Menzel-The Balcony Room".
