= The Meeting of Frederick II and Joseph II in Neisse in 1769 =

Painting by Adolph Menzel

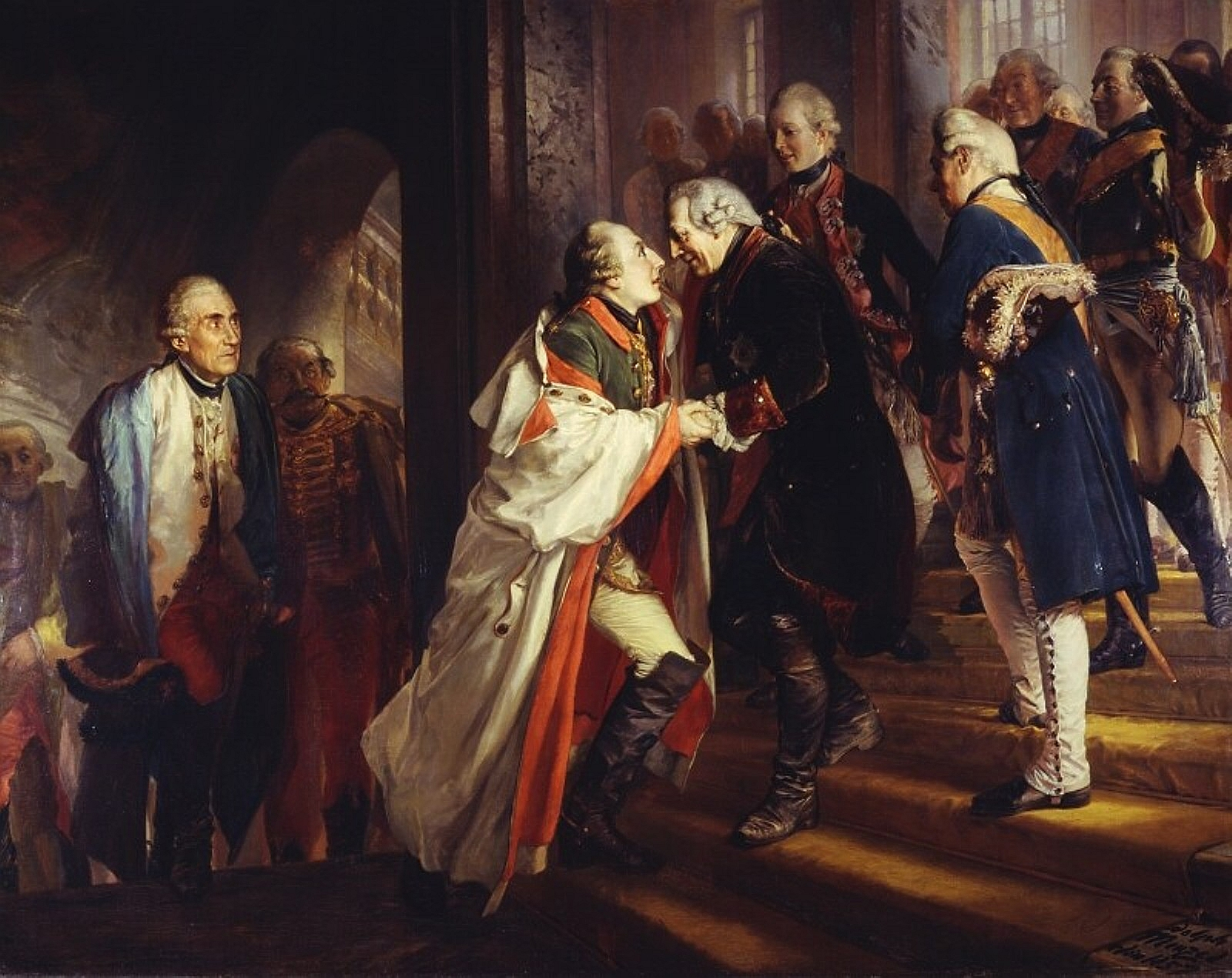
- Artist: Adolph Menzel
- Year: 1855-1857
- Medium: oil on canvas
- Dimensions: 247 cm × 318 cm (97 in × 125 in)
- Location: Alte Nationalgalerie, Berlin

The Meeting of Frederick II and Joseph II in Neisse in 1769 is an oil on canvas history painting by Adolph Menzel, executed in 1855–1857, showing the meeting of Frederick II of Prussia with Joseph II, Holy Roman Emperor at Neisse on 25 August 1769. It is now in the Alte Nationalgalerie, in Berlin.

== Theme ==
In the War of the Austrian Succession, from 1740 to 1748, and in the Seven Years' War, from 1756 to 1763, Prussia under Frederick II and Austria under Maria Theresa, were bitter opponents. The long-standing struggles ended for the Habsburg monarchy with the loss of Silesia.

Maria Theresa's son Archduke Joseph, Holy Roman Emperor since 1765, admired the enlightened monarch Frederick for his military, administrative and economic successes, and from 1766 tried to meet him. After initial resistance from Maria Theresa, the encounter took place in 1769 in the residential town of Neisse, near the border, where Frederick was staying for military maneuvers. Joseph, as Count von Falkenstein, arrived in Neisse around noon on August 25 and went straight to the prince-bishop's palace, where Frederick received him. The encounter was attended by senior nobles and military officials from both sides. The Kaiser and the King stayed in Neisse until August 28th. During the day they watched the Prussian maneuvers, in the evening they visited the Opéra comique.

== History and description ==
Menzel, who himself chose the episode as the subject for the history painting commissioned by the Association of German Art Associations for Historical Art, was already familiar with the scene since he had drawn the illustrations for Franz Theodor Kugler's book History of Frederick the Great. Kugler embellished the encounter in a more literary way and provided the artist with new details. Accordingly, the meeting of the two emperors had taken place in the stairwell of the Neisse Castle, where Friedrich met Joseph as he rushed up and both fell into each other's arms. Frederick then led the emperor “by the hand into the hall”. On the following days, too, “the two heads of the German Empire were only seen arm in arm”.

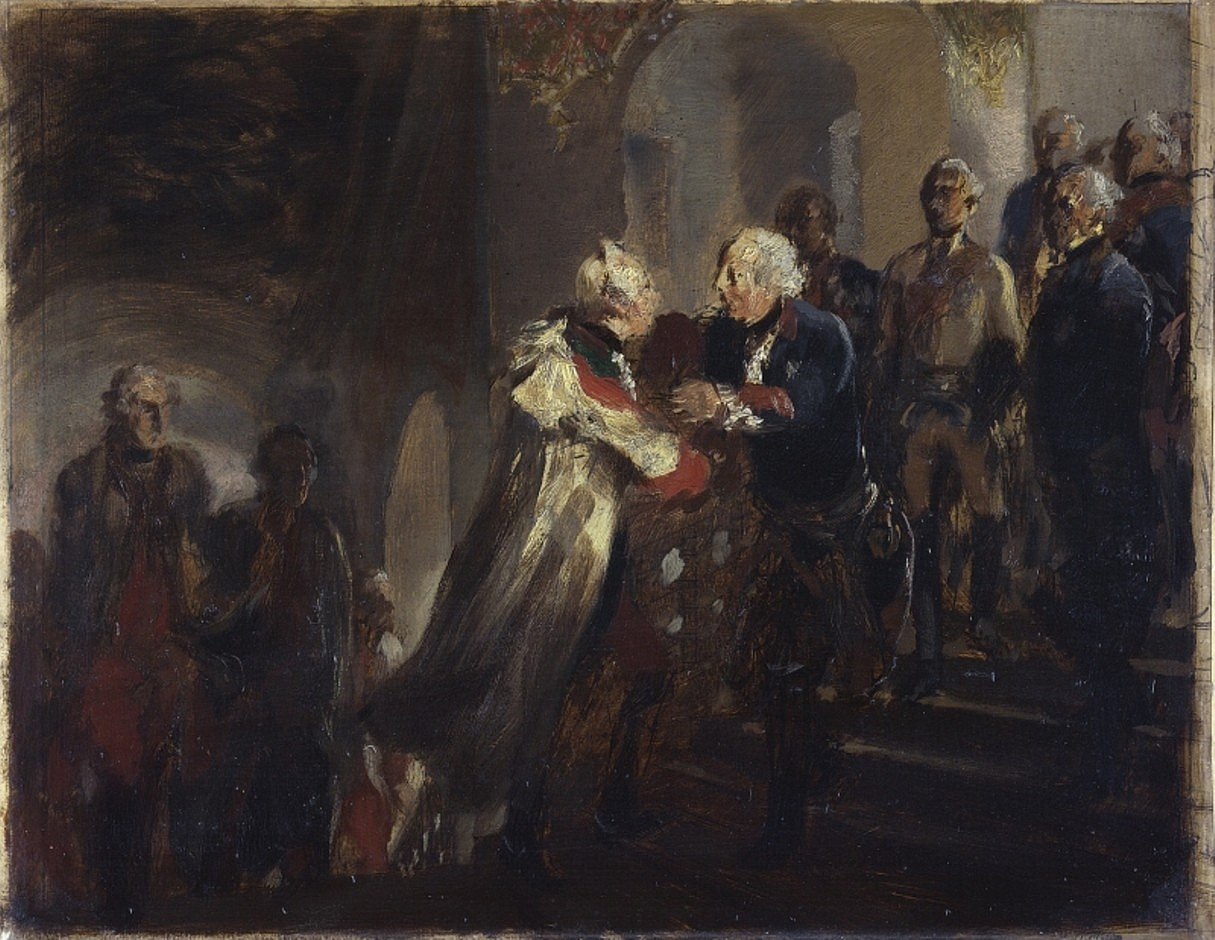
Original sketch (1858)

For his book illustration, Menzel chose the moment of the handshake. There, too, the staircase with the emperor's entourage can be seen in the background. However, Joseph himself is already on the same level as Friedrich and towers over him by a head. For the oil painting, Menzel chose the moment of the greeting in the stairwell. In the stairs, the young emperor is seen rushing up from below while he meets the older king approaching from above. So Joseph has to look up at Friedrich, and Menzel puts an expression of enthusiastic admiration on his face. His imperial dignity is expressed solely through the white, red-lined traveling cloak in contrast to Frederick's dark everyday clothing. The faces of both men come very close, while the greeting is done with both hands. However, Menzel does not show the hug described by Kugler. An oil sketch shows that Menzel initially considered to depict the beginning of an embrace between the two monarchs. Behind the rulers, several uniformed attendants appear in the semi-darkness of the stairwell; their facial expressions and gestures underline the importance of the moment.
