= Falcon Attacking a Pigeon =

Painting by Adolph Menzel

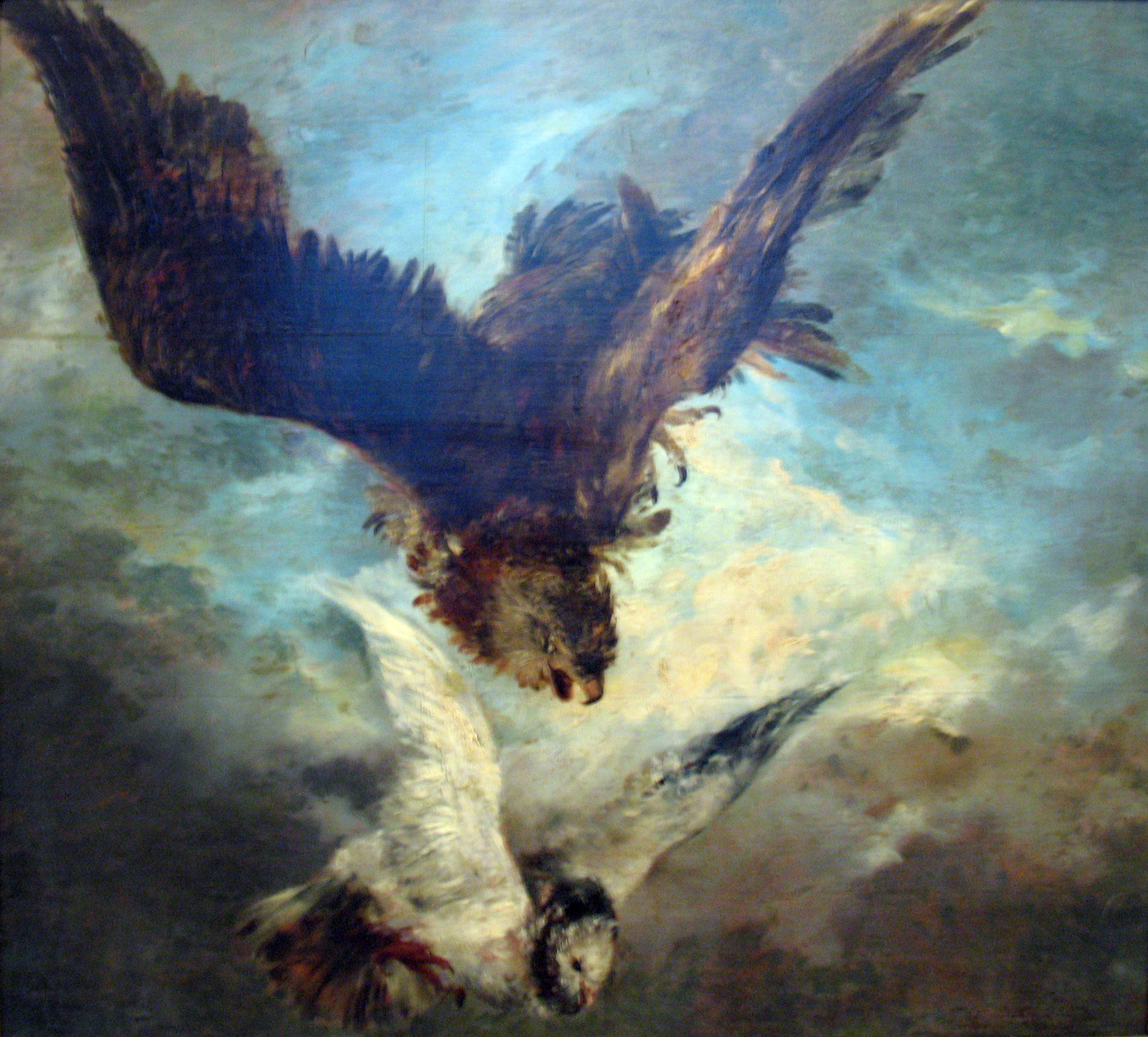
- Artist: Adolph Menzel
- Year: 1844
- Medium: oil on paper, laminated onto a wooden panel
- Dimensions: 102.7 cm × 119 cm (40.4 in × 47 in)
- Location: Alte Nationalgalerie, Berlin

Falcon Attacking a Pigeon (German - Falke auf eine Taube stoßend) is a painting by Adolph Menzel, produced in 1844 as a hunting target. It is now in the Alte Nationalgalerie in Berlin.

== Description ==
The painting shows a falcon, with an open beak and spread claws, pouncing in a turn from the top right on a white pigeon, which, coming from the left, also with spread feet and folded down, spread tail, as if it were about to land, immediately flies under him. The scene is shown in full format: the outstretched wings of the bird of prey reach into the upper left corner of the picture and the upper edge of the picture, while the tail feathers of the prey end just above the lower edge of the picture. The background is a representation of the sky, which towards the edges of the painting takes on a gloomy, gray-greenish tint and seems to merge downwards into a suggested forest or city backdrop, while there is more sky blue in the middle and the central point of the composition, the space between the beak ready to be grabbed and the claws of the falcon and the prey, is highlighted by a white cloud in the background.

== History ==
This is one of Menzel's earlier works. The painting, executed on several sheets of paper in oil paint and mounted on a wooden plate, was created around 1844. It was apparently actually used as a target image in a shooting club, as numerous bullet points that were later repaired prove. The painting came into the possession of the Berlin National Gallery in 1906. It was sold by the Berlin art dealer Ernst Zaeslein. In Georg Dehio's History of German Art, the picture was described as a masterpiece that Menzel did not held in great appreciation.

== Title ==
The title of the picture, in which the extended participle follows its reference word and which in some publications also contains a comma after the word "Falcon", was used several times by Germanists for considerations of the participle. In a 1962 anthology of the magazine Wirkendes Wort, for example, one could read that participles were a frequently used means in the fine arts to vividly reproduce the content of a picture, but that the picture would be “even more expressive in language if the participle follows its antecedent” and still take the final position behind the verbal additions, as is the case with Menzel's pigeon picture title.
