= Adolph Menzel =

German artist (1815–1905)

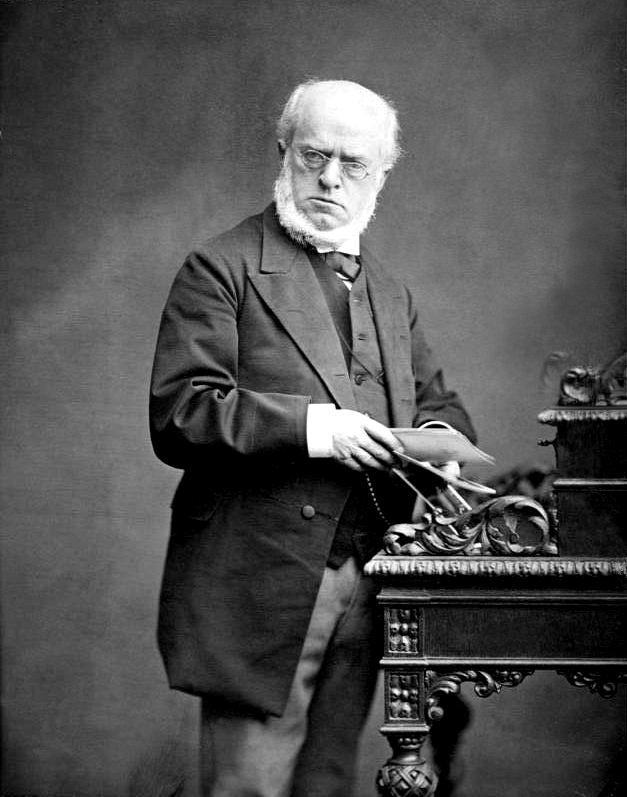
- Adolph von Menzel in 1900
- Born: 8 December 1815; Breslau, Silesia, Kingdom of Prussia
- Died: 9 February 1905 (aged 89); Berlin, German Empire
- Known for: Painting and etching
- Style: Realism

Signature
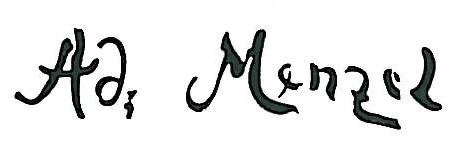

Adolph Friedrich Erdmann von Menzel (8 December 1815 – 9 February 1905) was a German realist artist noted for drawings, etchings, and paintings. Along with Caspar David Friedrich, he is considered one of the two most prominent German painters of the 19th century, and was the most successful artist of his era in Germany. First known as Adolph Menzel, he was knighted in 1898 and changed his name to Adolph von Menzel.

His popularity in his native country, owing especially to his history paintings, was such that few of his major paintings left Germany, as many were quickly acquired by museums in Berlin. Menzel's graphic work (and especially his drawings) were more widely disseminated; these, along with informal paintings not initially intended for display, have largely accounted for his posthumous reputation.

Although he traveled in order to find subjects for his art, to visit exhibitions, and to meet with other artists, Menzel spent most of his life in Berlin, and was, despite numerous friendships, by his own admission detached from others. It is likely that he felt socially estranged for physical reasons alone—he had a large head, and stood about four foot six inches (137 cm).

== Biography ==
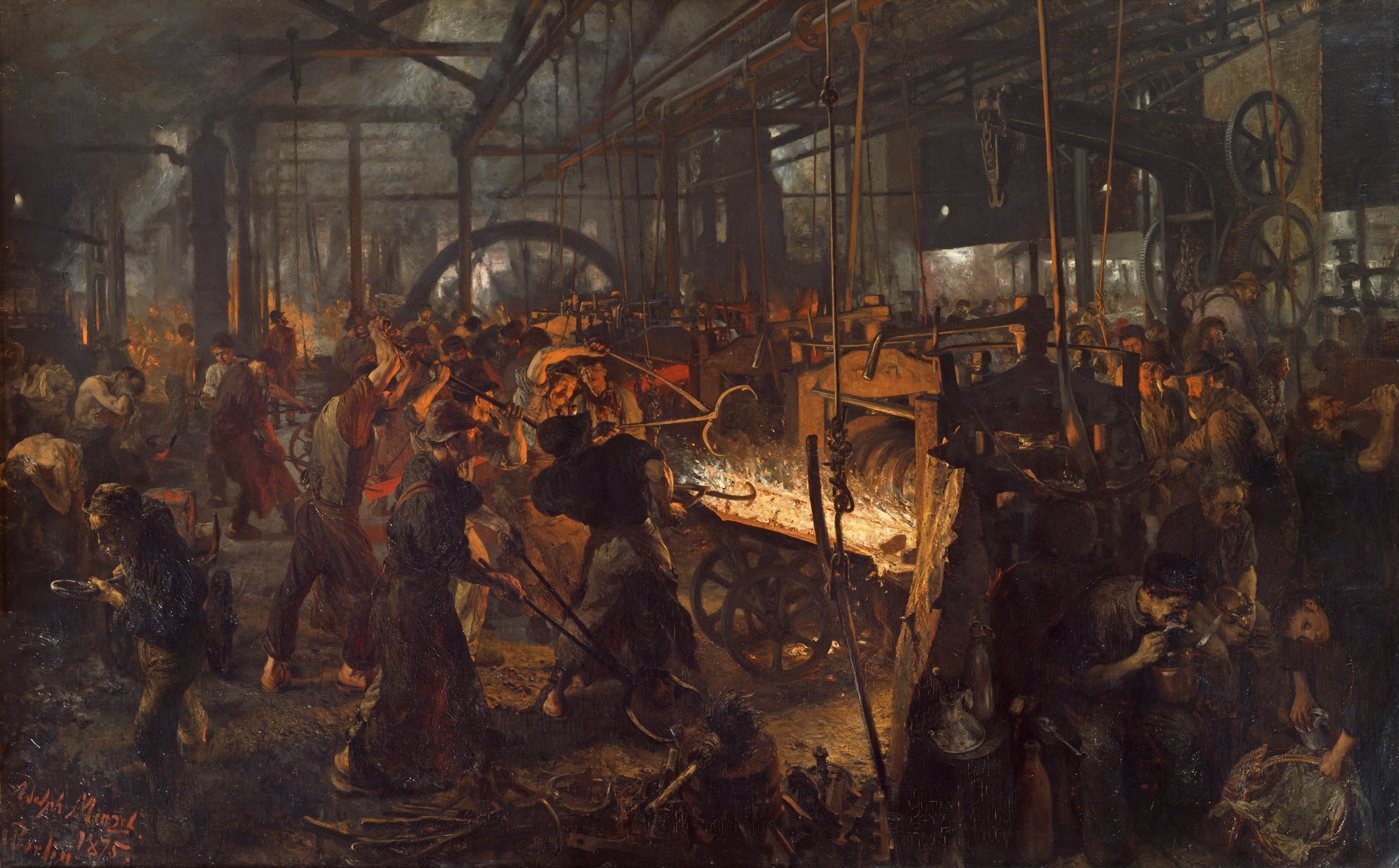
The Iron Rolling Mill (Modern Cyclopes), 1872–1875

=== Career ===
Menzel was born to German parents in Breslau, Prussian Silesia (now Wrocław, Poland), on 8 December 1815. His father was a lithographer and intended to educate his son as a professor, but did not thwart his taste for art. After resigning his teaching post, Menzel senior set up a lithographic workshop in 1818. In 1830 the family moved to Berlin, and in 1832 Adolph was forced to take over the lithographic business on the death of his father. In 1833, he studied briefly at the Berlin Academy of Art, where he drew from plaster casts and ancient sculptures; thereafter Menzel was self-taught. Louis Friedrich Sachse of Berlin published his first work in 1833, an album of pen-and-ink drawings reproduced on stone, to illustrate Goethe's little poem, Kunstlers Erdenwallen. He executed lithographs in the same manner to illustrate Denkwürdigkeiten aus der brandenburgisch-preussischen Geschichte; The Five Senses and The Prayer, as well as diplomas for various corporations and societies.

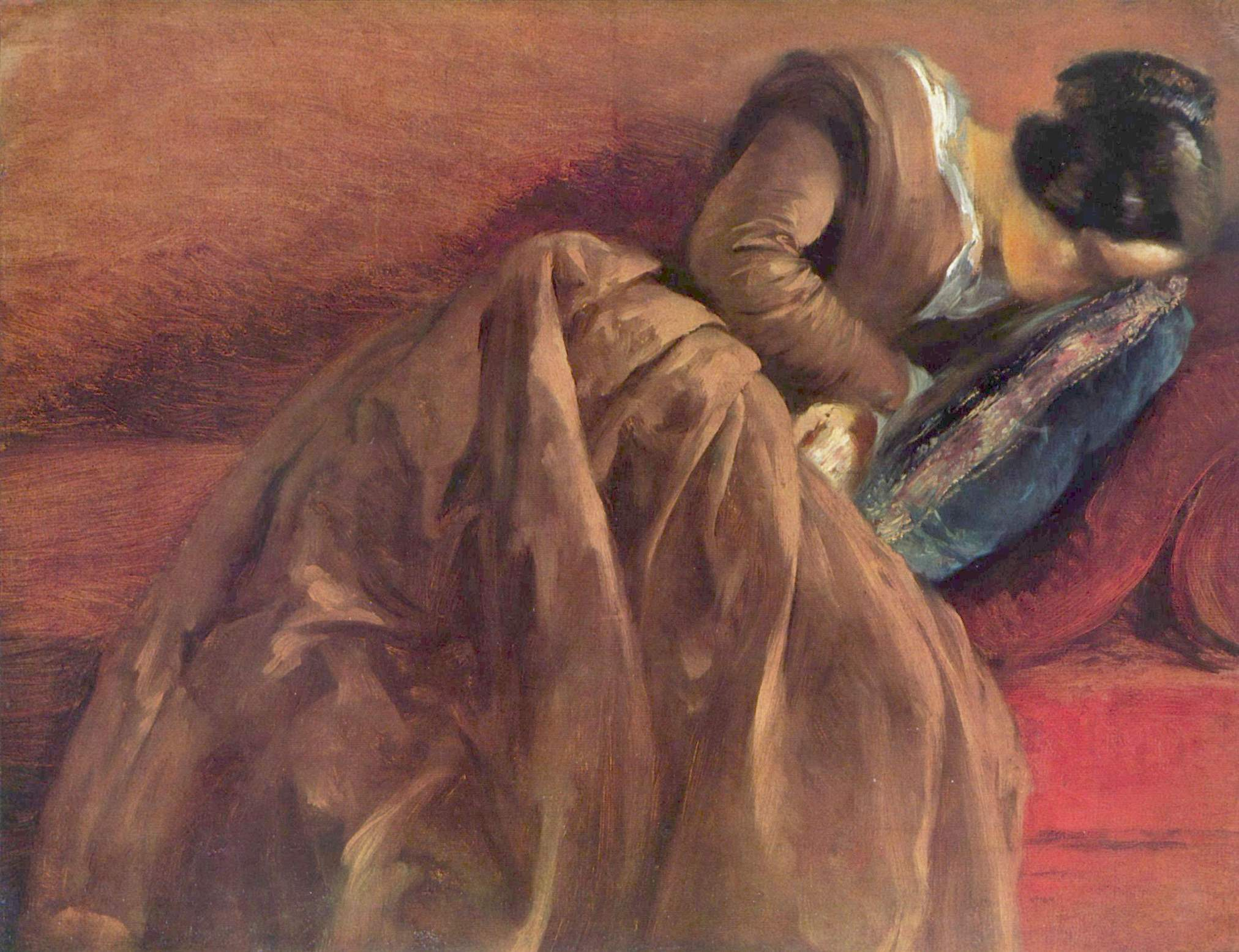
Emilie Menzel Asleep, c. 1848. Oil on paper, 46.8 × 60 cm. Hamburger Kunsthalle

From 1839 to 1842, he produced 400 drawings, largely introducing to Germany the technique of wood-engraving, to illustrate the Geschichte Friedrichs des Grossen (History of Frederick the Great) by Franz Kugler. He subsequently brought out Friedrichs des Grossen Armee in ihrer Uniformirung (The Uniforms of the Army under Frederick the Great), Die Soldaten Friedrichs des Grossen (The Soldiers of Frederick the Great); and finally, by order of King Frederick William IV, he illustrated the works of Frederick the Great, Illustrationen zu den Werken Friedrichs des Grossen (1843–1849). The artist had a deep sympathy for the Prussian king. In one of his letters to Johann Jakob Weber, he said that it was his intention to represent the monarch as a man who was both hated and admired—simply as he was, in other words, as a man of the people. Through these works, Menzel established his claim to be considered one of the first, if not actually the first, of the illustrators of his day in his own line.

Menzel's fame came from his illustrations of the 18th-century Prussian monarch, Frederick the Great. As well as dedication to adding historical accuracy and attention to detail. Menzel also made sure to do research on the items he was painting. From 1840 and onward Menzel became admirable for his small paintings and drawings. In which he depicted his unconventional ideas.

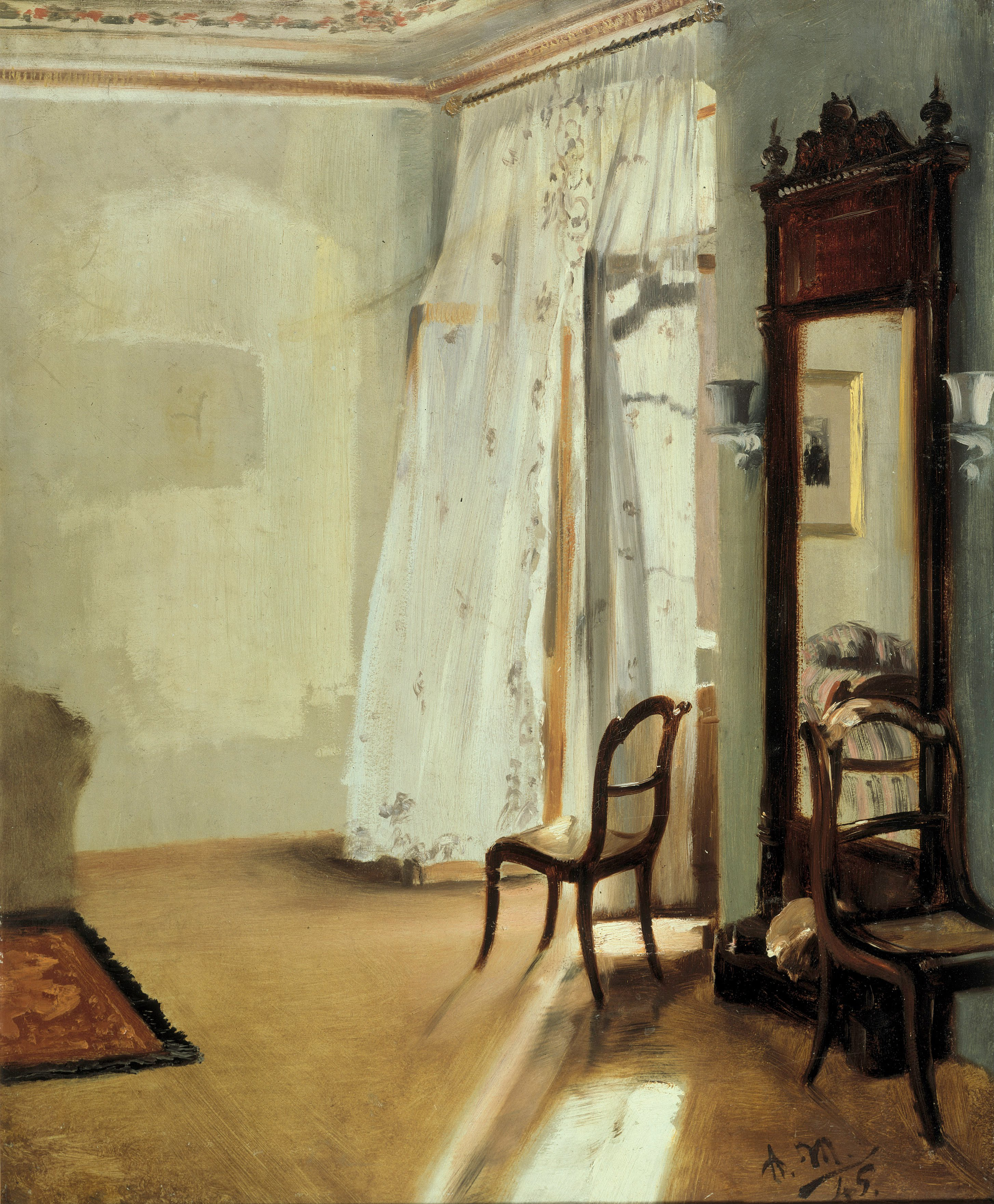
The Balcony Room, 1845

In the meantime, Menzel had also begun to study, unaided, the art of painting, and he soon produced a great number and variety of pictures. His paintings consistently demonstrated keen observation and honest workmanship in subjects dealing with the life and achievements of Frederick the Great, and scenes of everyday life, such as In the Tuileries, The Ball Supper, and At Confession. Among those considered most important of these works are Iron Rolling Mill (1872–1875) and The Market-place at Verona. When invited to paint The Coronation of Wilhelm I at Koenigsberg, he produced an exact representation of the ceremony without regard to the traditions of official painting.

During Menzel's life, his paintings were appreciated by Otto von Bismarck and Wilhelm I, and after his death they were appropriated for use as electoral posters by Adolf Hitler.

If these historical illustrations anticipated the qualities of early Impressionism, it is paintings such as The French Window and The Palace Garden of Prince Albert, both painted in the mid- 1840s, that now appeal as "among the most freely observed of mid-nineteenth century images." Such genre paintings evidence associations with French and English art. Though he was primarily an excellent draughtsman, art historian Julius Meier-Graefe considered him to be a "proto-impressionist" painter, whose graphic work hindered his painterly potentials. Private drawings and watercolors made of dead and dying soldiers in 1866 on the battlefields of the Austro-Prussian War are unsparing in their realism, and have been described by art historian Marie Ursula Riemann-Reyher as "unique in German art of the time."

== Later years ==
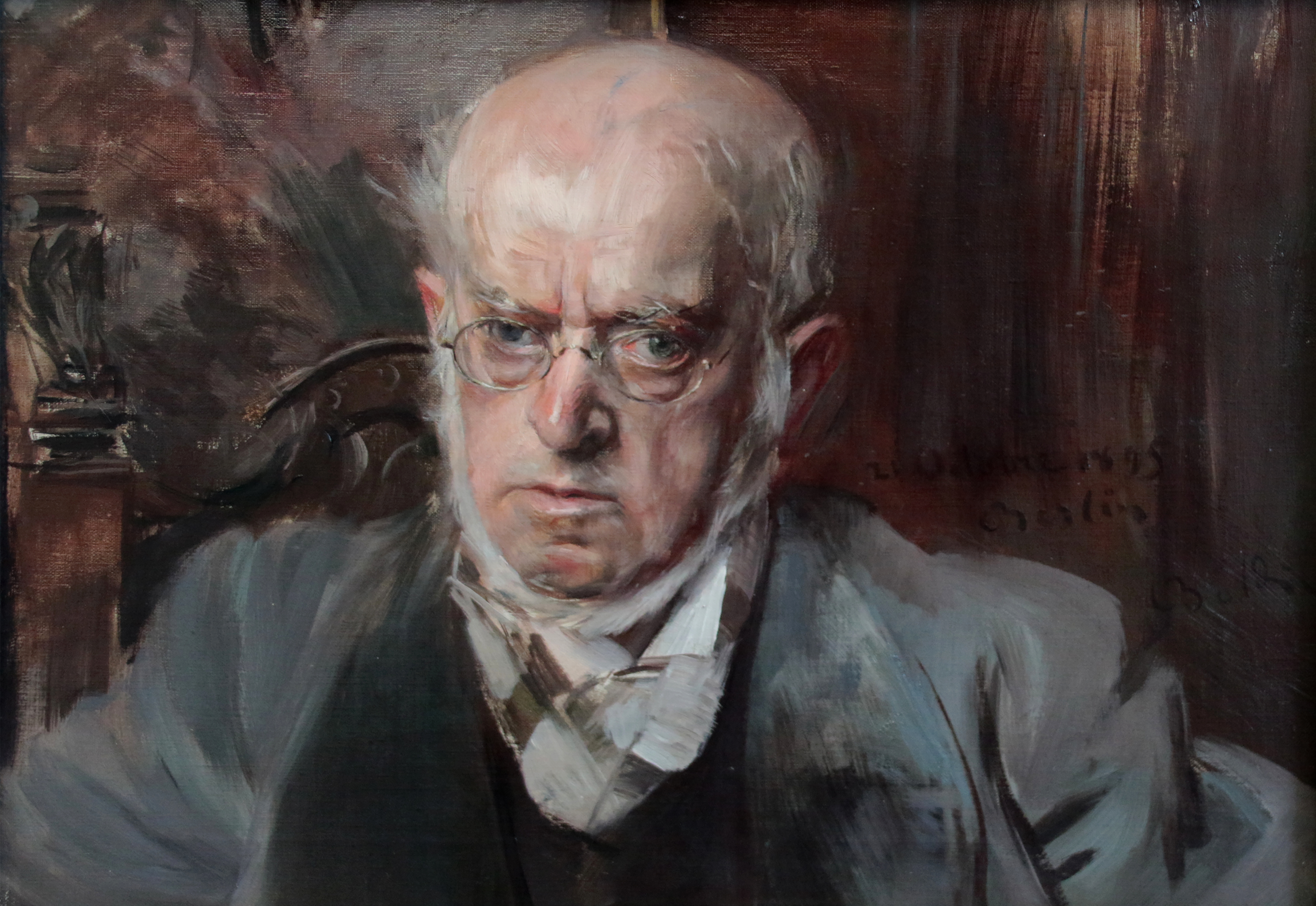
1895 portrait of Menzel by Giovanni Boldini, Alte Nationalgalerie, Berlin

The paintings which were available to the public garnered recognition not only within Germany, but from the French avant-garde as well: Edgar Degas admired and copied his work, calling him "the greatest living master", and Louis Edmond Duranty wrote of his art:

In a word, the man is everywhere independent, sincere, with sure vision, a decisive note that can sometimes be a little brutal....While being perfectly healthy he has the neurosis of truthfulness....The man who has measured with a compass the buttons on a uniform from the time of Frederick, when it is a matter of depicting a modern shoe, waistcoat, or coiffure, does not make them by approximations but totally, in their absolute form and without smallness of means. He puts there everything that is called for by the character (of the object). Free, large, and rapid in his drawing, no draftsman is as definitive as he.

Notwithstanding Menzel's professed estrangement from others, his renown entailed social obligations, and in the 1880s the poet Jules Laforgue described him as "no taller than a cuirassier-guard's boot, bedecked with pendants and orders, not missing a single one of these parties, moving among all these personages like a gnome and like the greatest enfant terrible for the chronicler." In Germany he received many honors, and in 1898 became the first painter to be admitted to the Order of the Black Eagle; by virtue of receiving the Order, Menzel was raised to the nobility, becoming "Adolph von Menzel". He was also made a member of the Académie des Beaux-Arts in Paris and the Royal Academy in London. After his death in 1905 in Berlin, his funeral arrangements were directed by the Kaiser, who walked behind his coffin.

== Exhibitions (selection) ==
"Adolph Menzel 1815–1905. Das Labyrinth der Wirklichkeit", Nationalgalerie (National Gallery) and Kupferstichkabinett (Museum of Prints and Drawings), Staatliche Museen zu Berlin – Preußischer Kulturbesitz, 7 Feb – 11 May 1997 "Menzel. Maler auf Papier", Kupferstichkabinett (Museum of Prints and Drawings), Staatliche Museen zu Berlin – Preußischer Kulturbesitz, 20 September 2019 – 19 January 2020.

== World War II ==
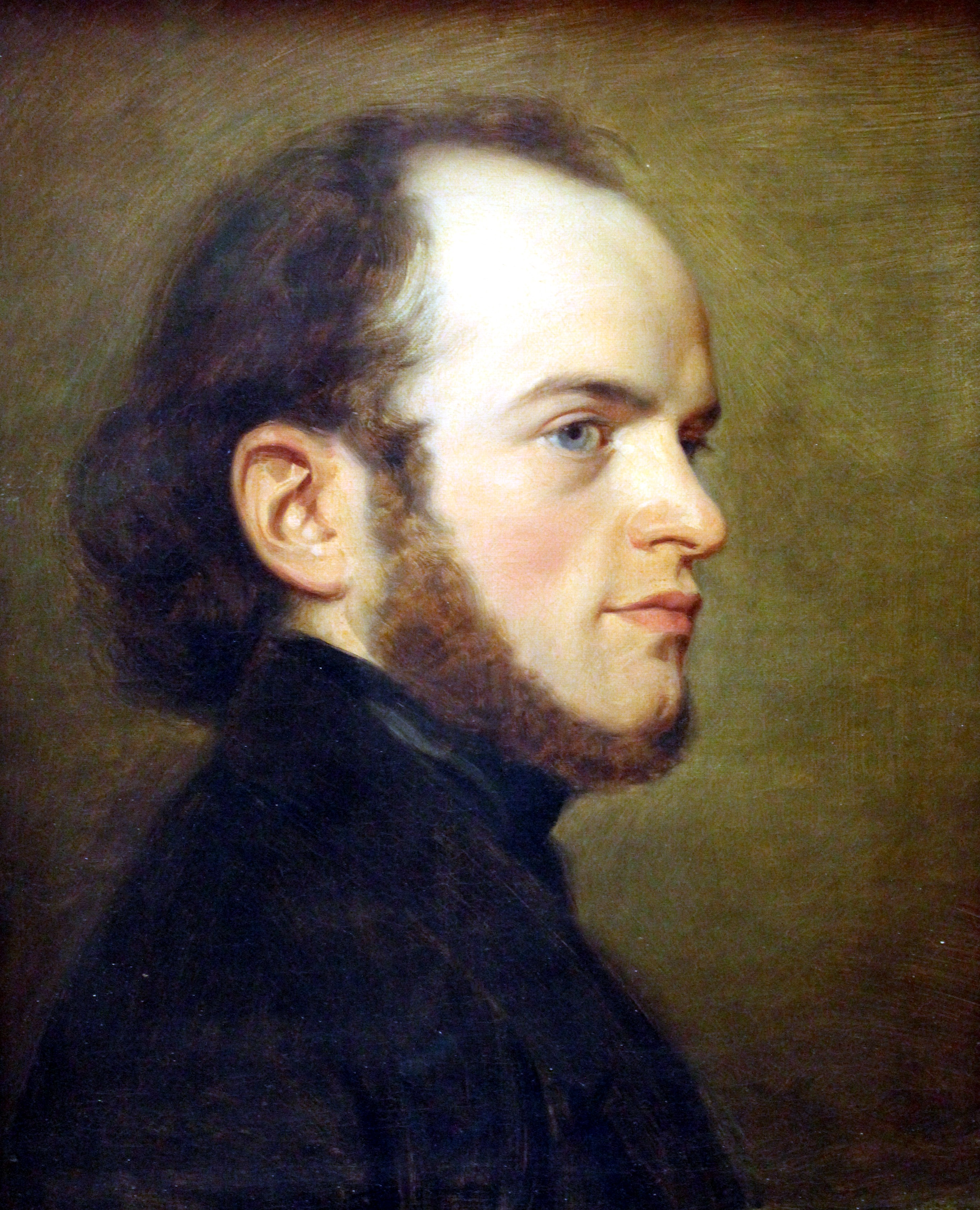
Adolph Menzel in 1839

Several important works by Menzel were seized, sold by force or under duress during the Nazi period. Some of these have been restituted in the 21st century.

- In 2014, the Menzel's Stehende Rüstungen (1886) ("Standing Suits of Armour" or "Armoury Fantasy") was restituted by the Albertina Museum in Vienna to the heirs of Adele Pächter, who was murdered at the Theresienstadt concentration camp.
- In 2015, the Menzel pastel "Lady with a Red Blouse" was restituted to the heirs of Erna Felicia and Hans Lachmann-Mosse. Oskar Reinhart had purchased the pastel from the art dealer Fritz Nathan in Munich in 1934 and donated it to the Foundation in 1940.
- Others have been claimed but not restituted. Also in 2015 the Dutch Limbach Commission refused a restitution request for the Menzel painting "A Weekday in Paris" which had belonged to the Jewish banker Georges Behrens.
- In 2017 Germany's Culture Minister Monika Gruetter returned Menzel's Interior of a Gothic Church to the heirs of Elsa Cohen who, persecuted by the Nazis because Jewish, sold it to Hitler's art dealer Hildebrand Gurlitt in 1938. It was rediscovered in the art stash of his son, Cornelius Gurlitt.

The German Lost Art Foundation lists numerous Menzel artworks on its website including 22 searched for by his biggest private collector, Ludwig Ginsberg.

== Cultural references ==
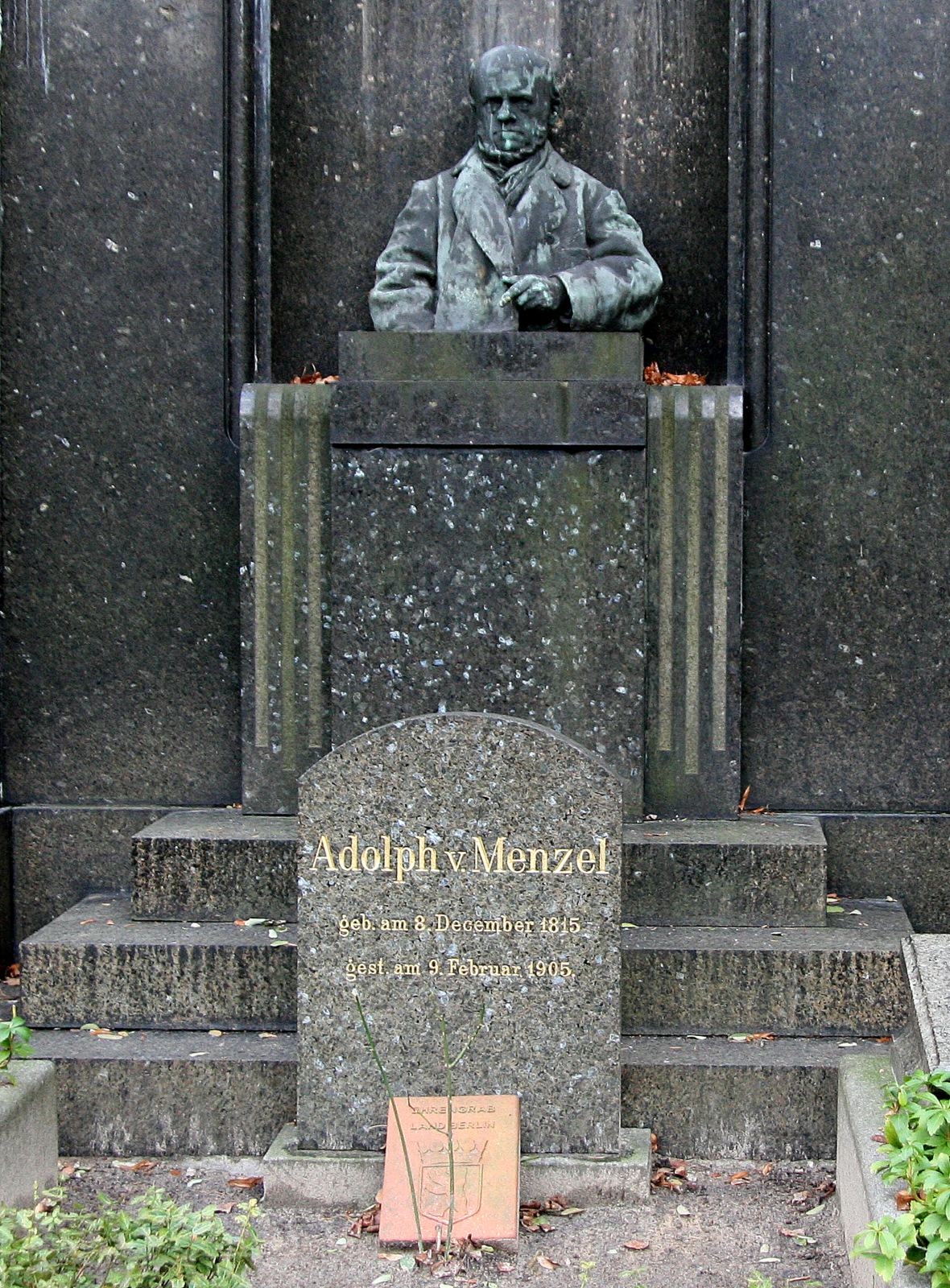
Menzel's tomb in Berlin

Menzel and an exhibition of his art plays a pivotal role in the HBO series The Gilded Age (2023), Season 2 Episode 3.

== Gallery ==
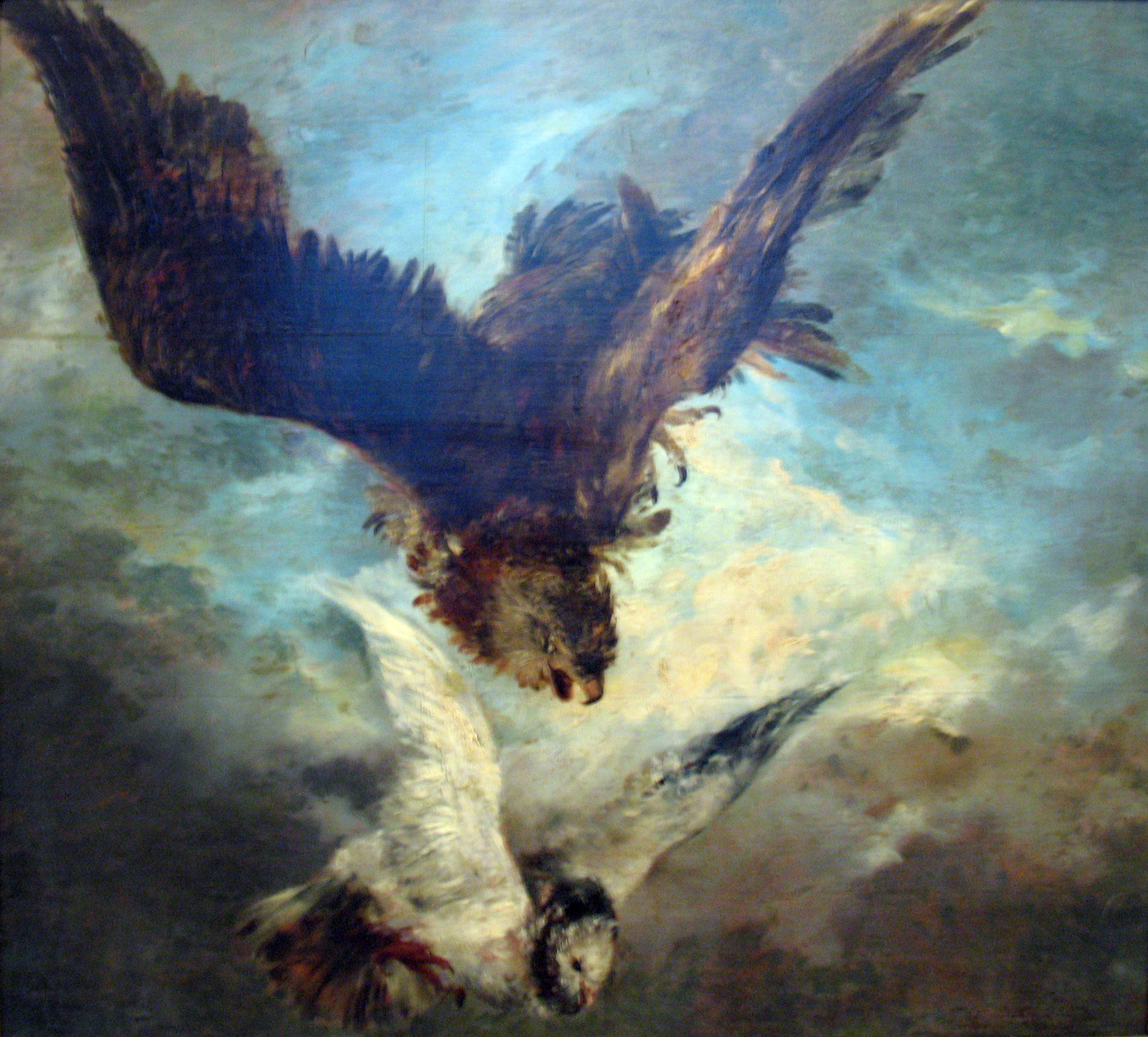
Falcon Attacking a Pigeon, 1844

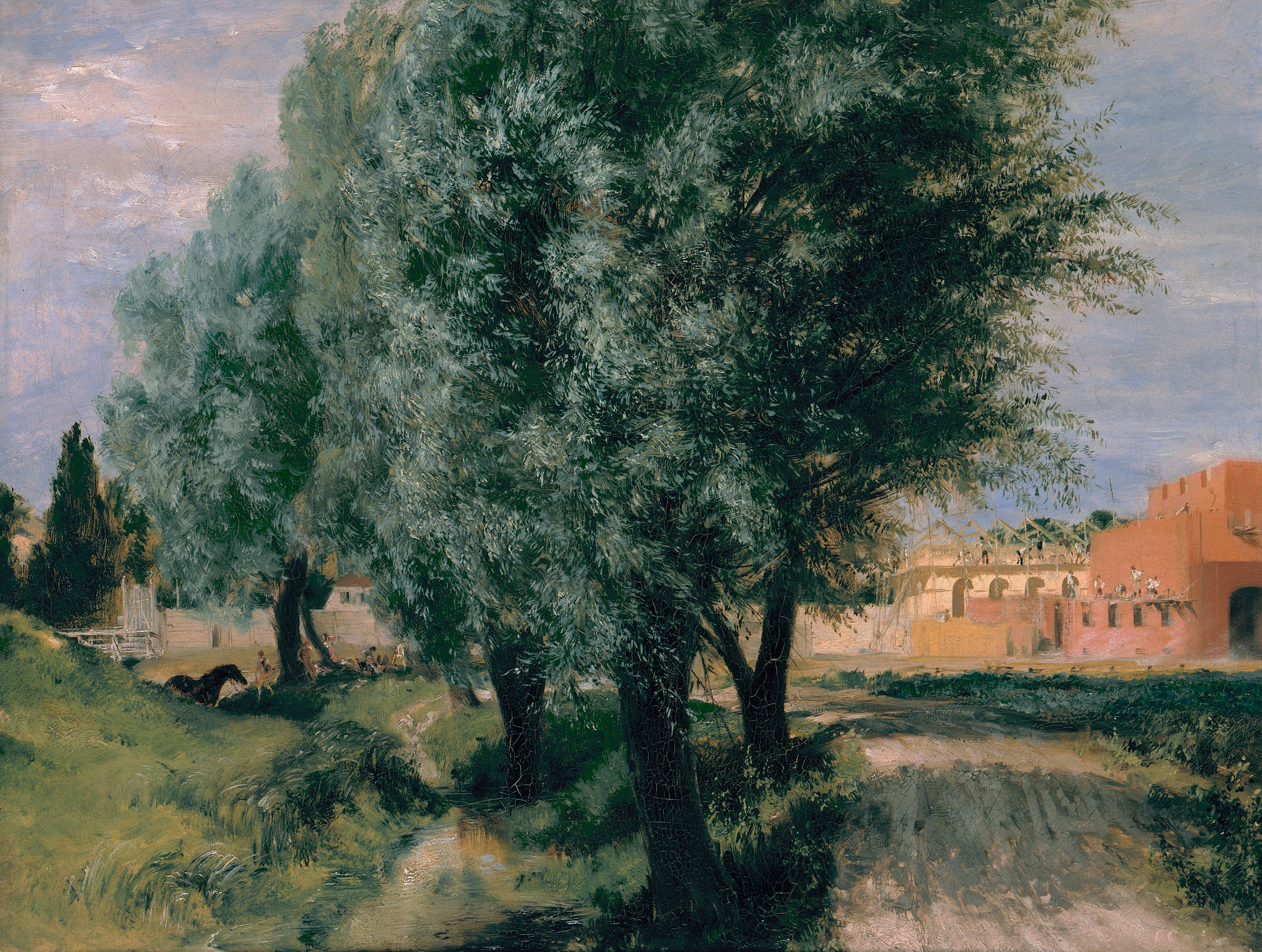
Building Site with Willows, 1846

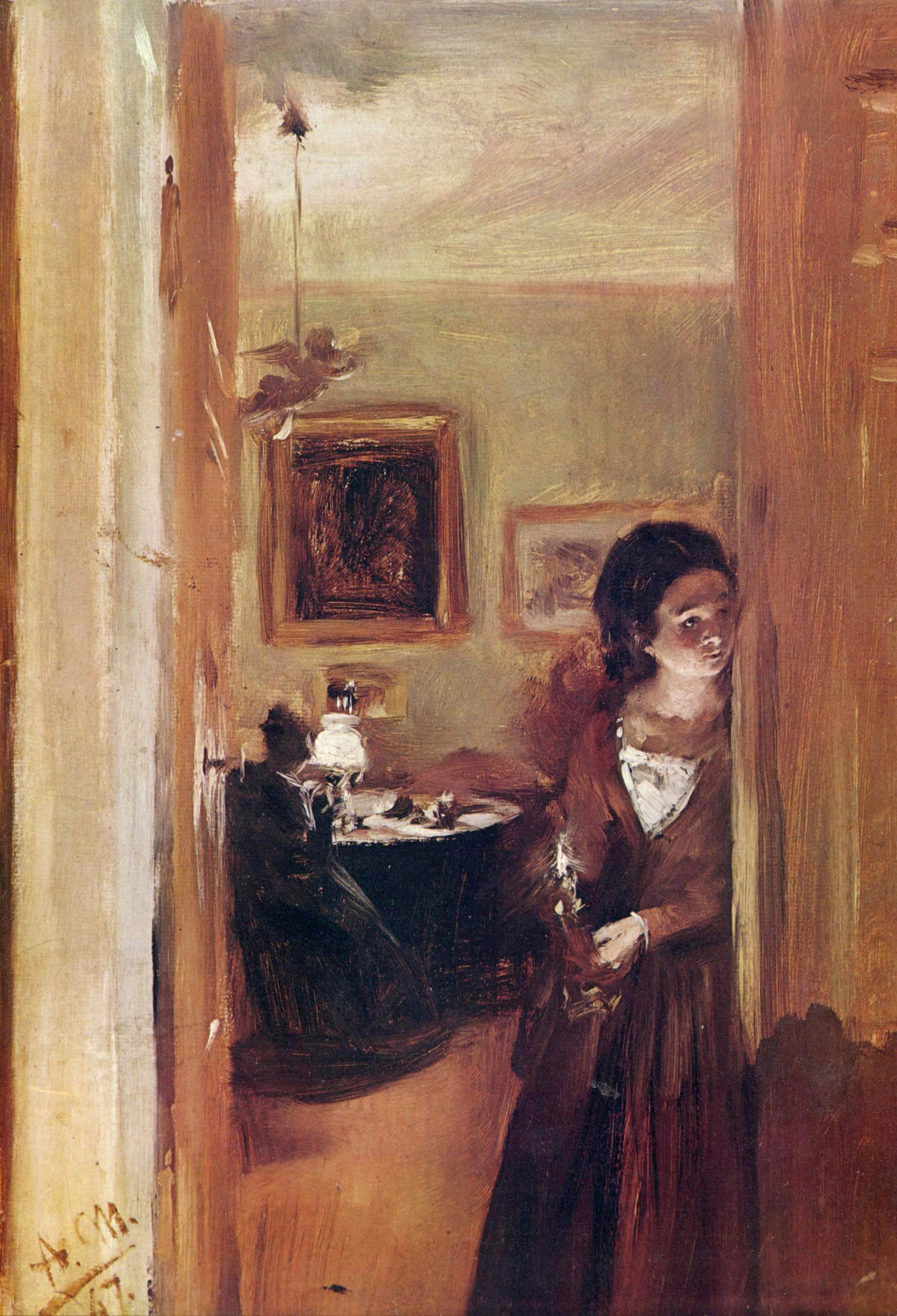
Living Room with the Artist's Sister, 1847

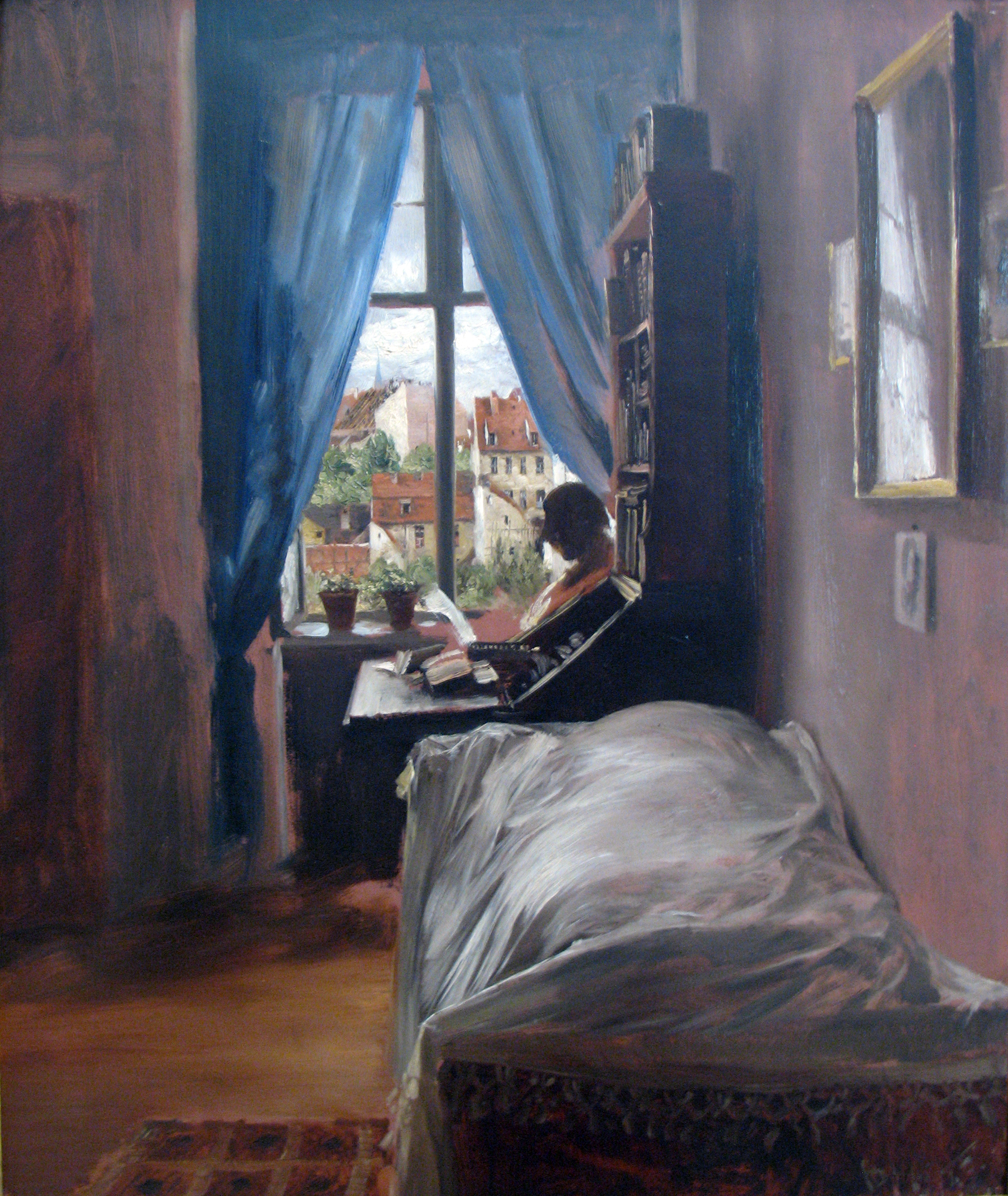
The Bedroom of the Artist in the Ritterstraße, 1847

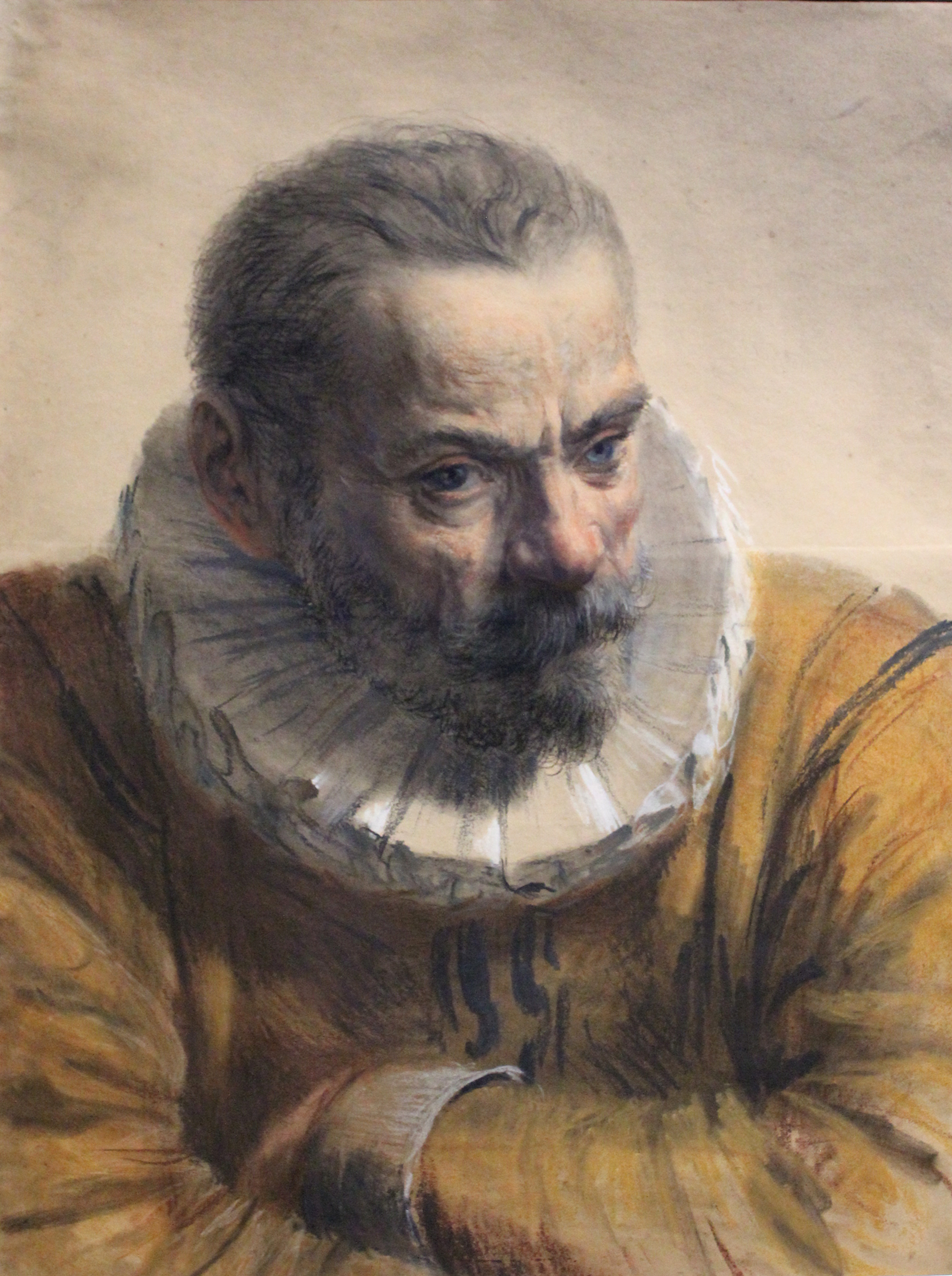
Study of a Man with a Ruff Collar, c. 1850

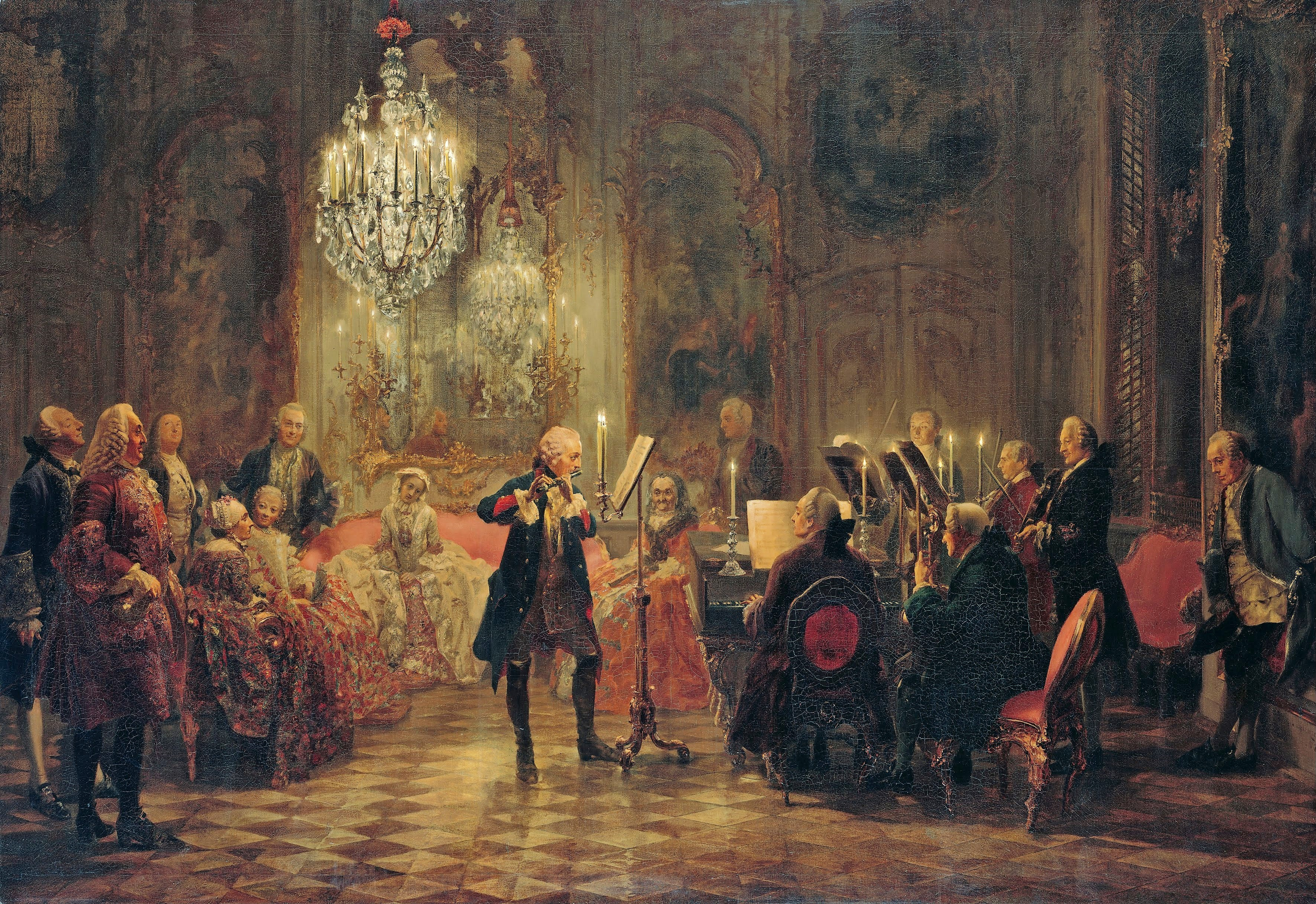
Frederick the Great Playing the Flute at Sanssouci, 1852

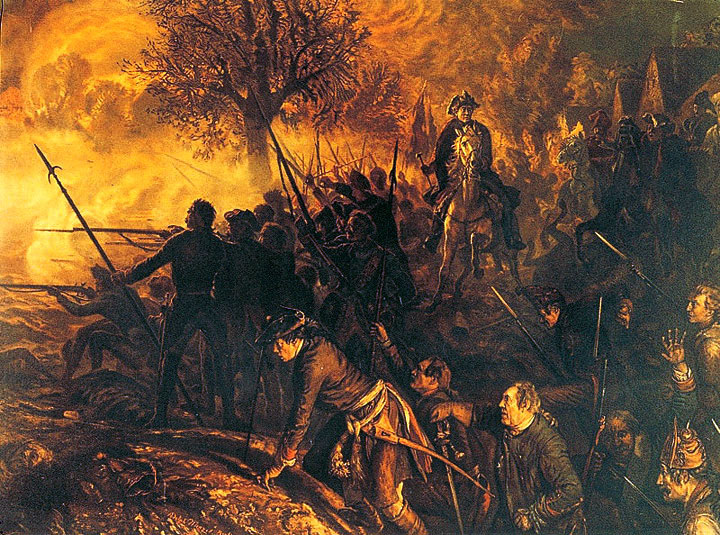
Frederick II at Hochkirch, 1856

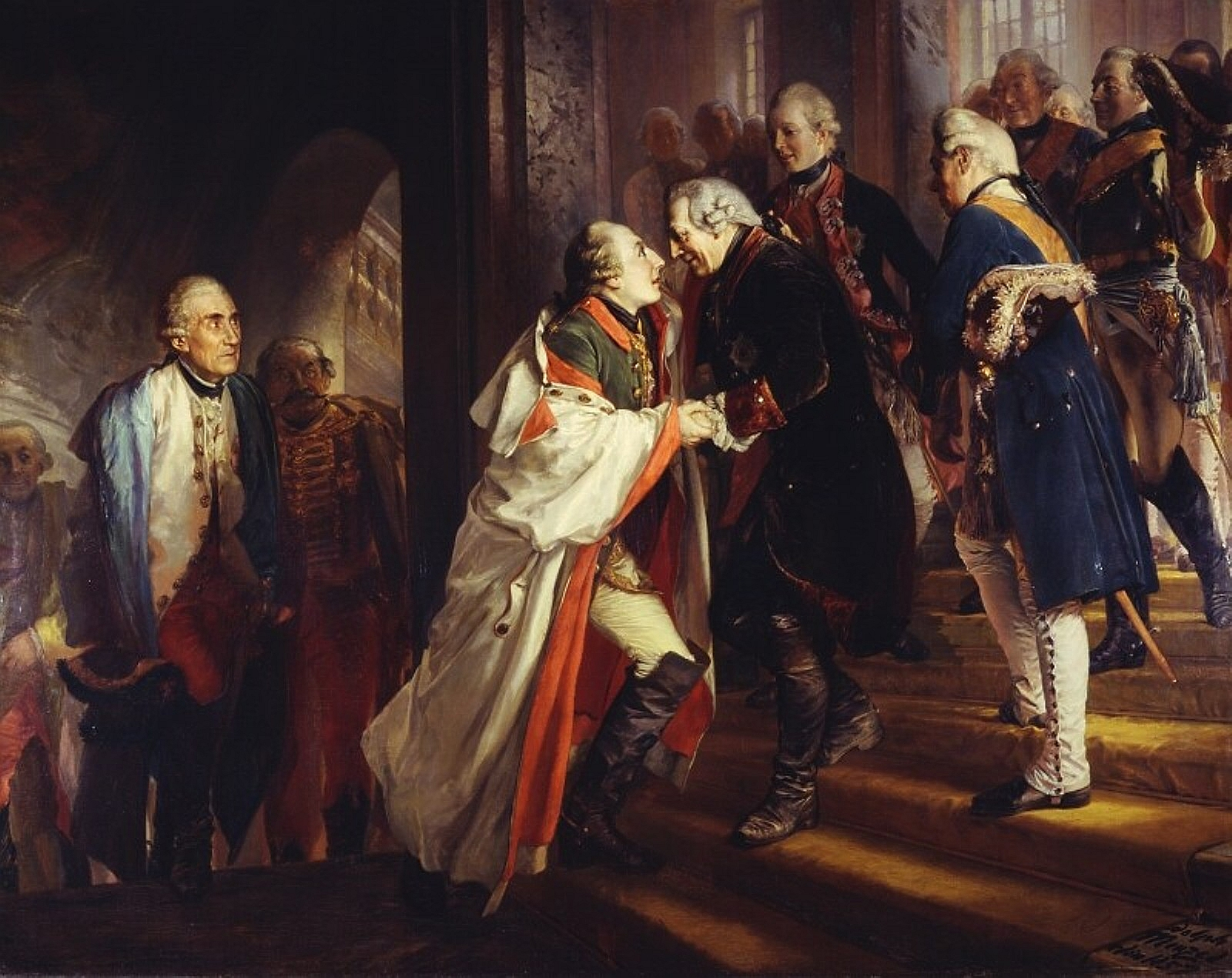
The Meeting of Frederick II and Joseph II in Neisse in 1769, 1857

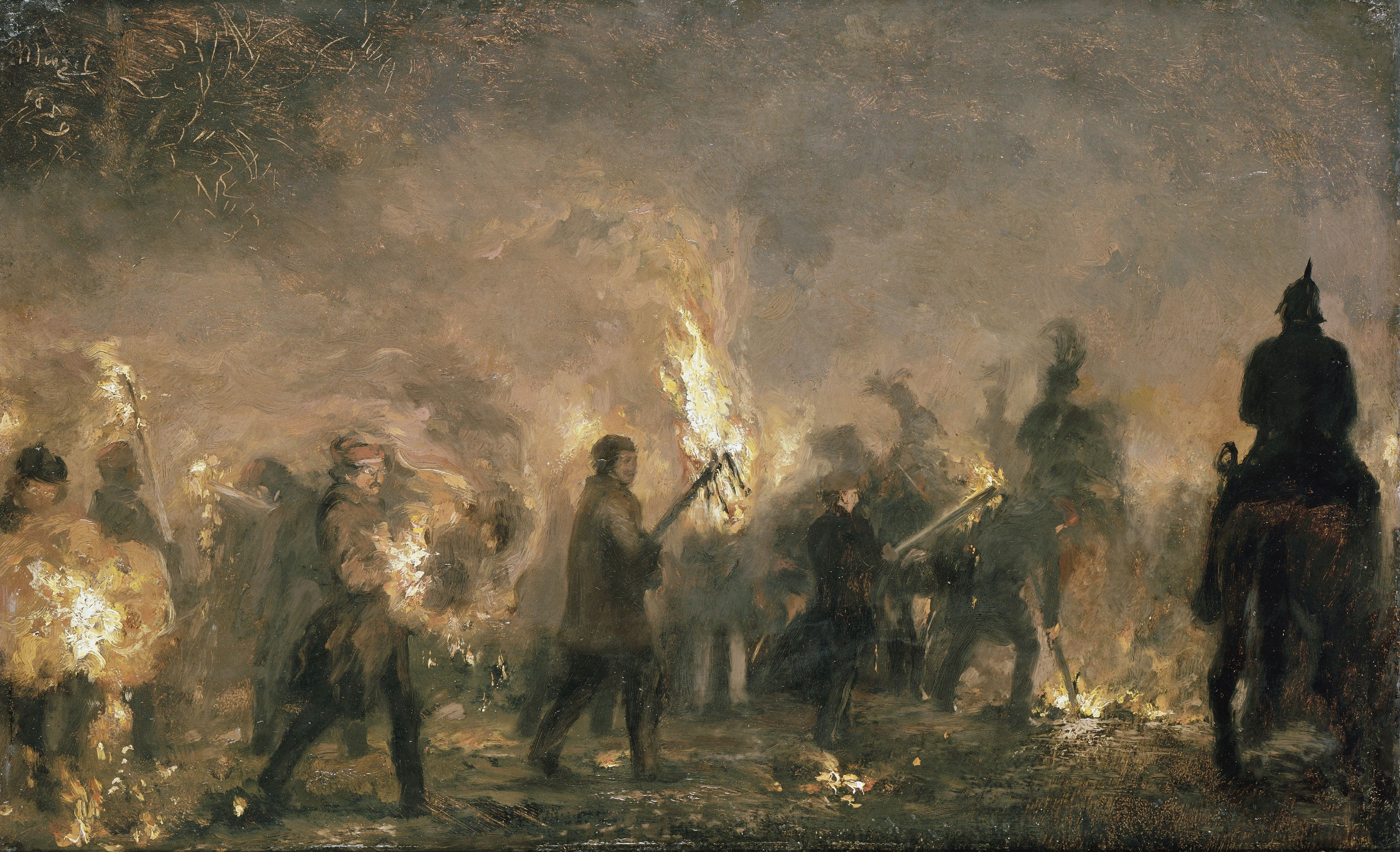
Students illuminated procession, 1859

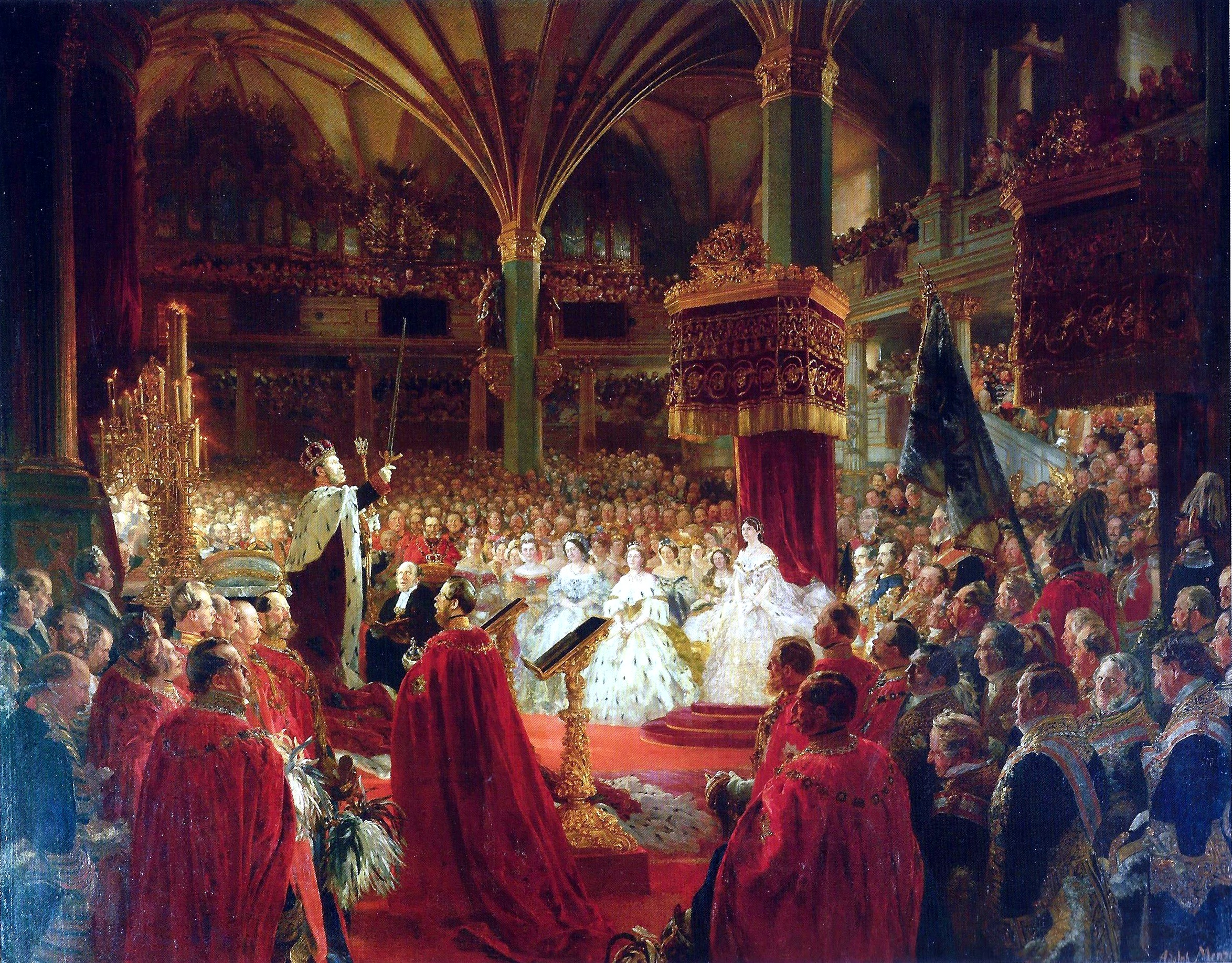
Coronation of Wilhelm I, 1865

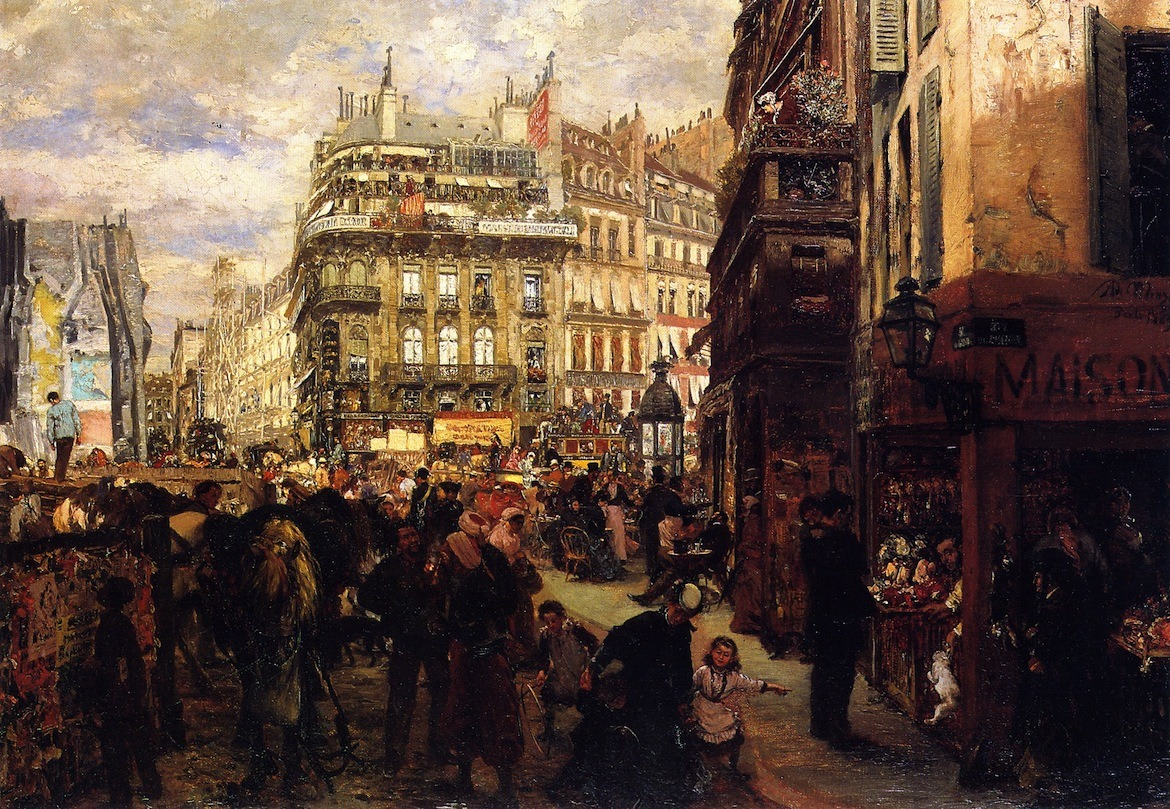
Weekday in Paris, 1869

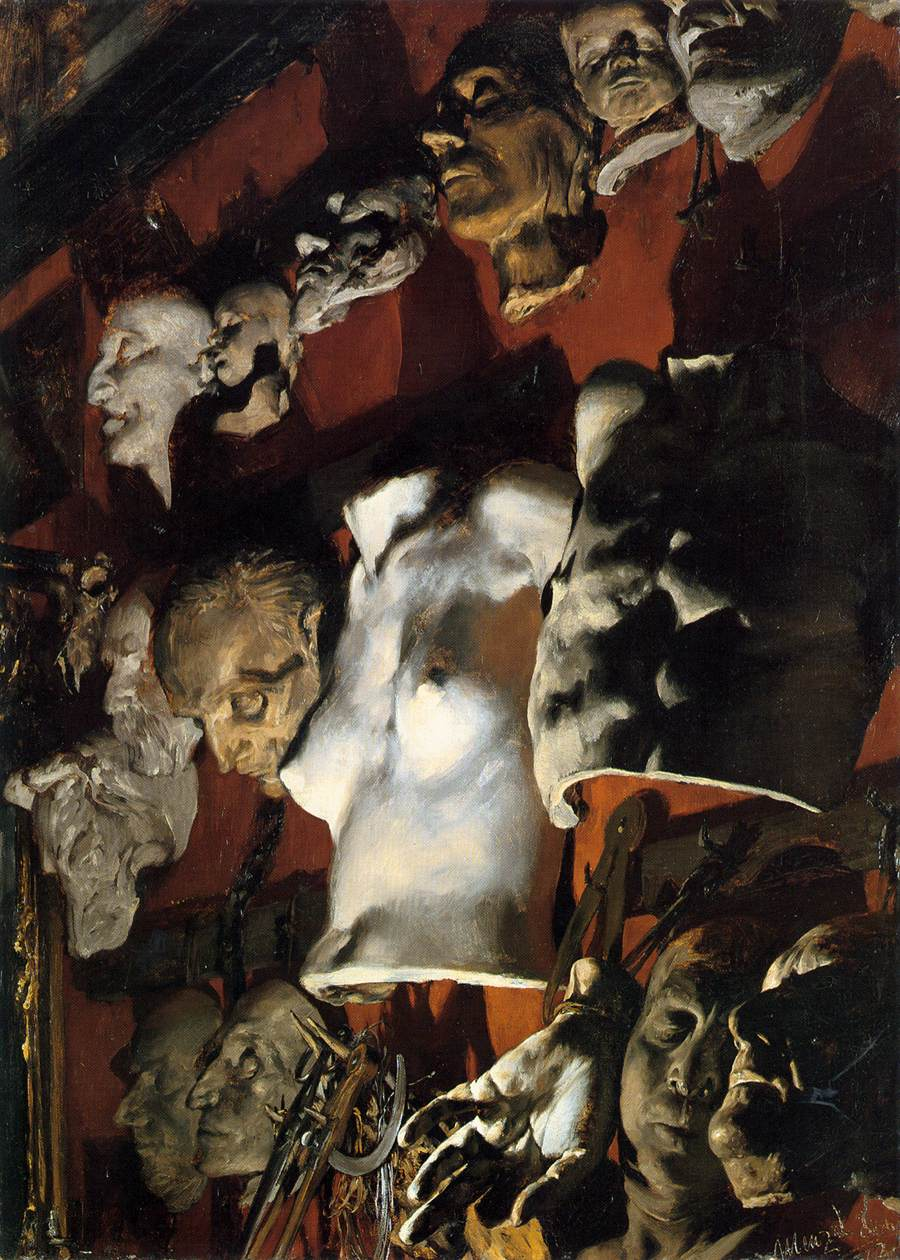
Studio Wall, 1872

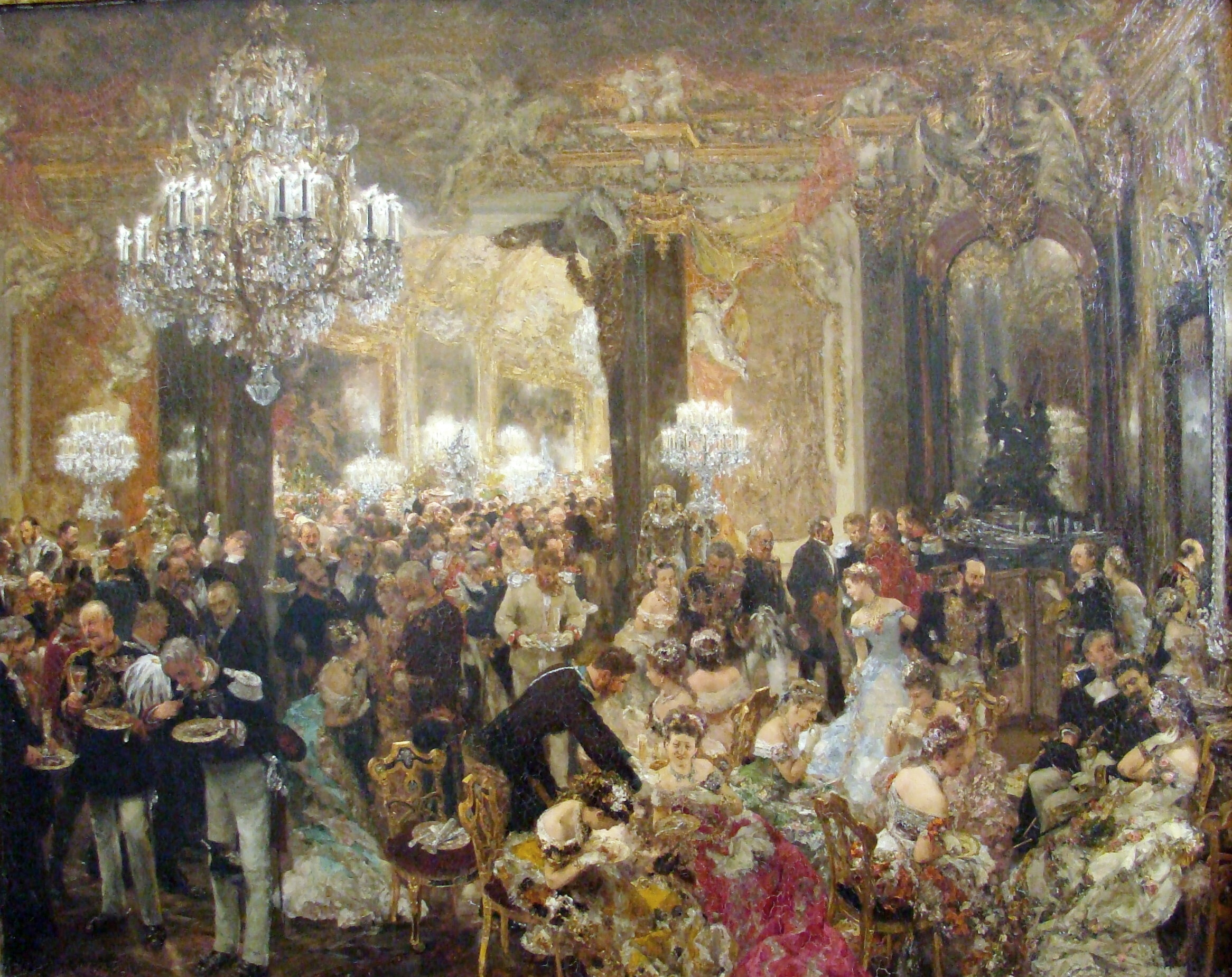
Supper at the Ball, 1878

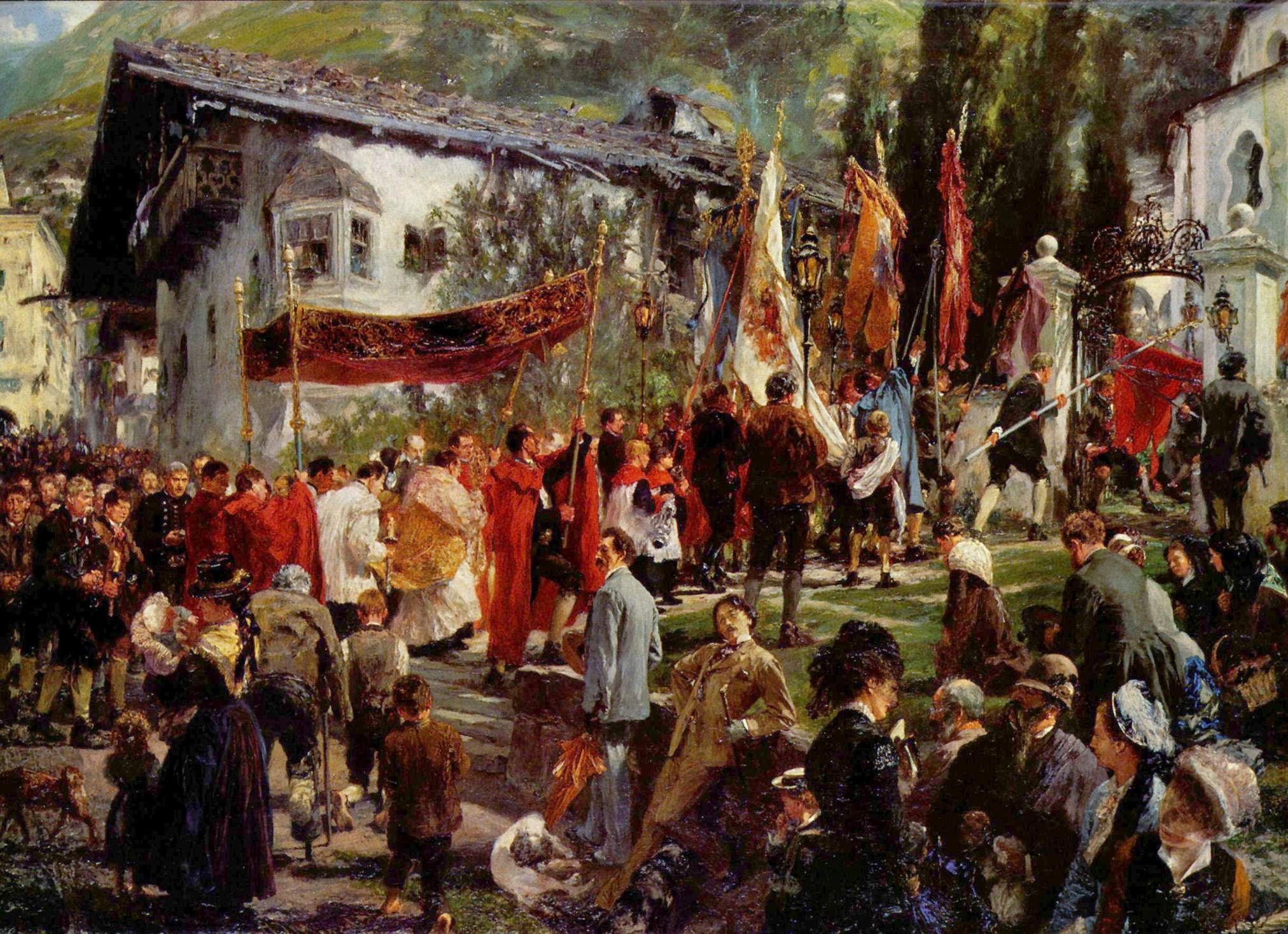
Fronleichnamsprozession in Hofgastein, 1880

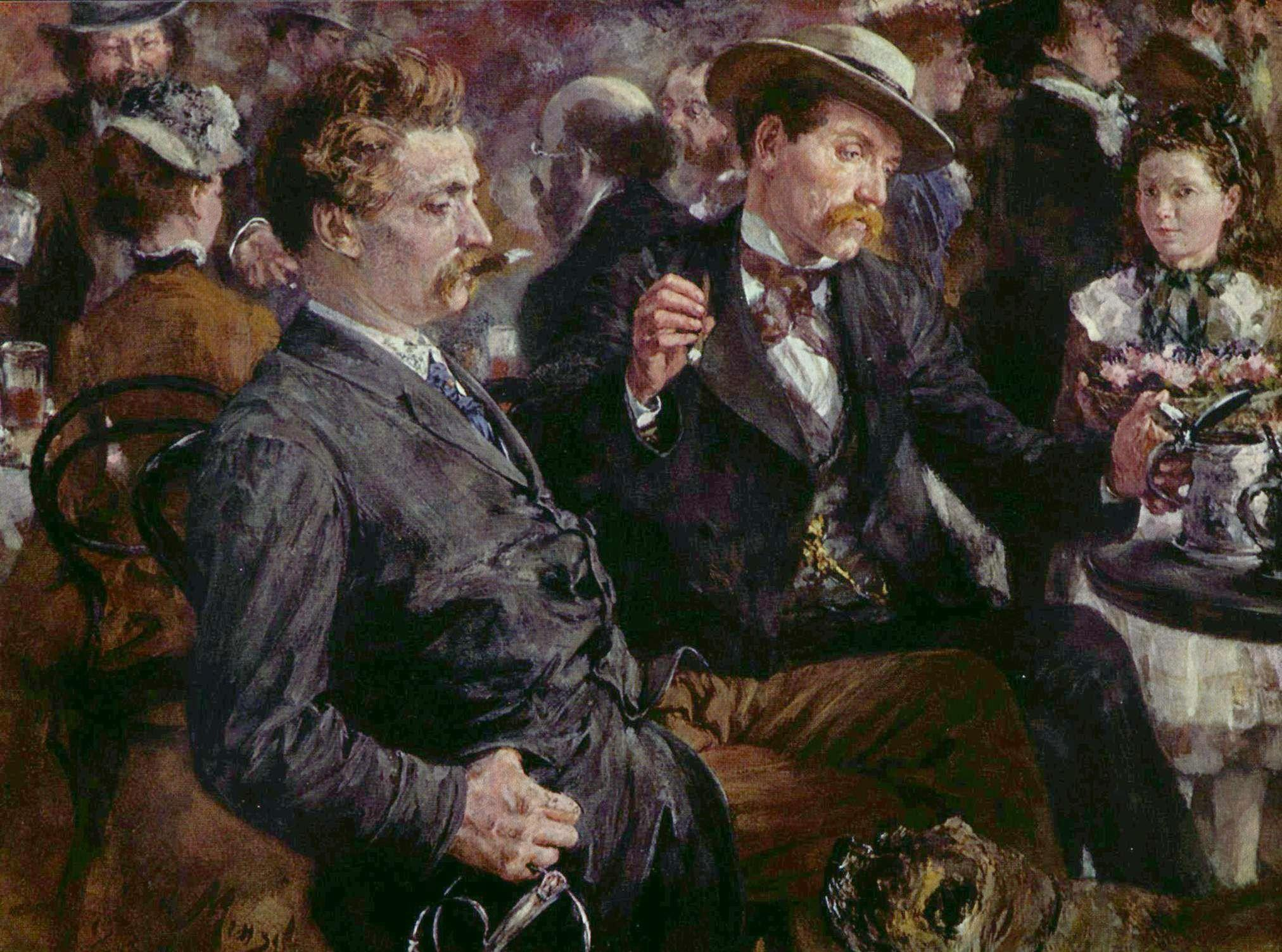
At the Beer Garden, 1883

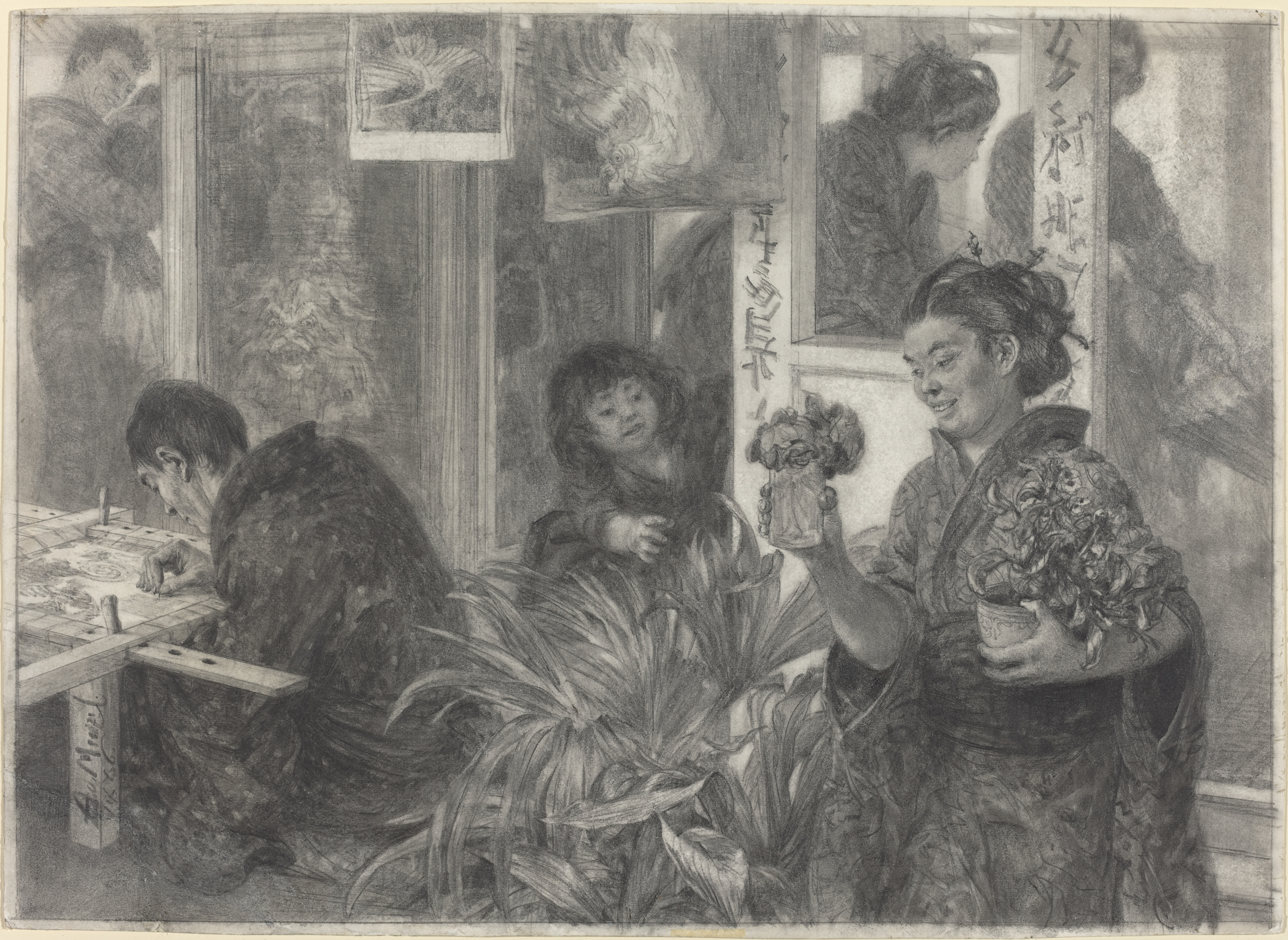
Japanese Artist at Work, 1886, graphite on paperboard, National Gallery of Art
