= Ludwig Ginsberg =

Ludwig Ginsberg (31 December 1873 – 30 March 1939) was a Berlin banker and art collector. He owned the largest private collection of works by Adolph von Menzel ever held in private hands.

== Life ==
Ludwig Ginsberg was the son of Adolf (or Adolph) and Franziska Ginsberg (née Sachs). He grew up with five siblings at Viktoriastraße 9 in Berlin. In the same household, the violinist Bronisław Huberman was also educated, after arriving in Berlin in 1892 for further musical training under Joseph Joachim.

The Ginsberg family originated from Russia and operated cotton-processing factories in Poland during the 19th century. In 1866, the banking firm Gebrüder Ginsberg was founded, in which Ludwig Ginsberg later became a partner until he lost his position in 1938 during the process of “Aryanisation.”

== Nazi era persecution ==
The Aryanization of the family business, the private bank Gbr. Ginsberg, deprived Ludwig Ginsberg of his professional livelihood. The Reich Flight Tax was imposed on Ludwig Ginsberg and his two daughters. He was forced to downsize and eventually abandon his residence in the Tiergarten district, as well as to sell all his remaining art collections and valuables. With the help of Bronisław Huberman help, Alice Ginsberg, the elder daughter of Ludwig Ginsberg, managed to emigrate shortly before the outbreak of the Second World War and reached London. Lotte Ginsberg, the younger daughter, who was intellectually disabled and dependent on care, could not flee and was deported and murdered in 1942.

Ginsberg died on 29 March 1939 at 4:15 a.m. in his apartment at Barbarossastraße 52 in Berlin-Schöneberg. His death certificate lists “influenza pneumonia” as the cause of death.

== Art collection ==
Ginsberg’s Menzel collection included valuable works on paper and rare prints. In 1935, 120 lots were sold.

Large parts of Ginsberg’s collection are considered lost. Individual works have resurfaced in the collections of the Berlin Kupferstichkabinett and the Leopold Hoesch Museum in Düren. A research project at the Technical University of Berlin, initiated by Dodi Reifenberg, a great-grandnephew of Ginsberg, aims to trace the history of the collection. A monograph and an exhibition on the family’s story are also planned, accompanied by a documentary film directed by Julia Albrecht.

The heirs of Ludwig Ginsberg have registered search requests for 22 artworks at the German Lost Art Foundation.
