= Franz Theodor Kugler =

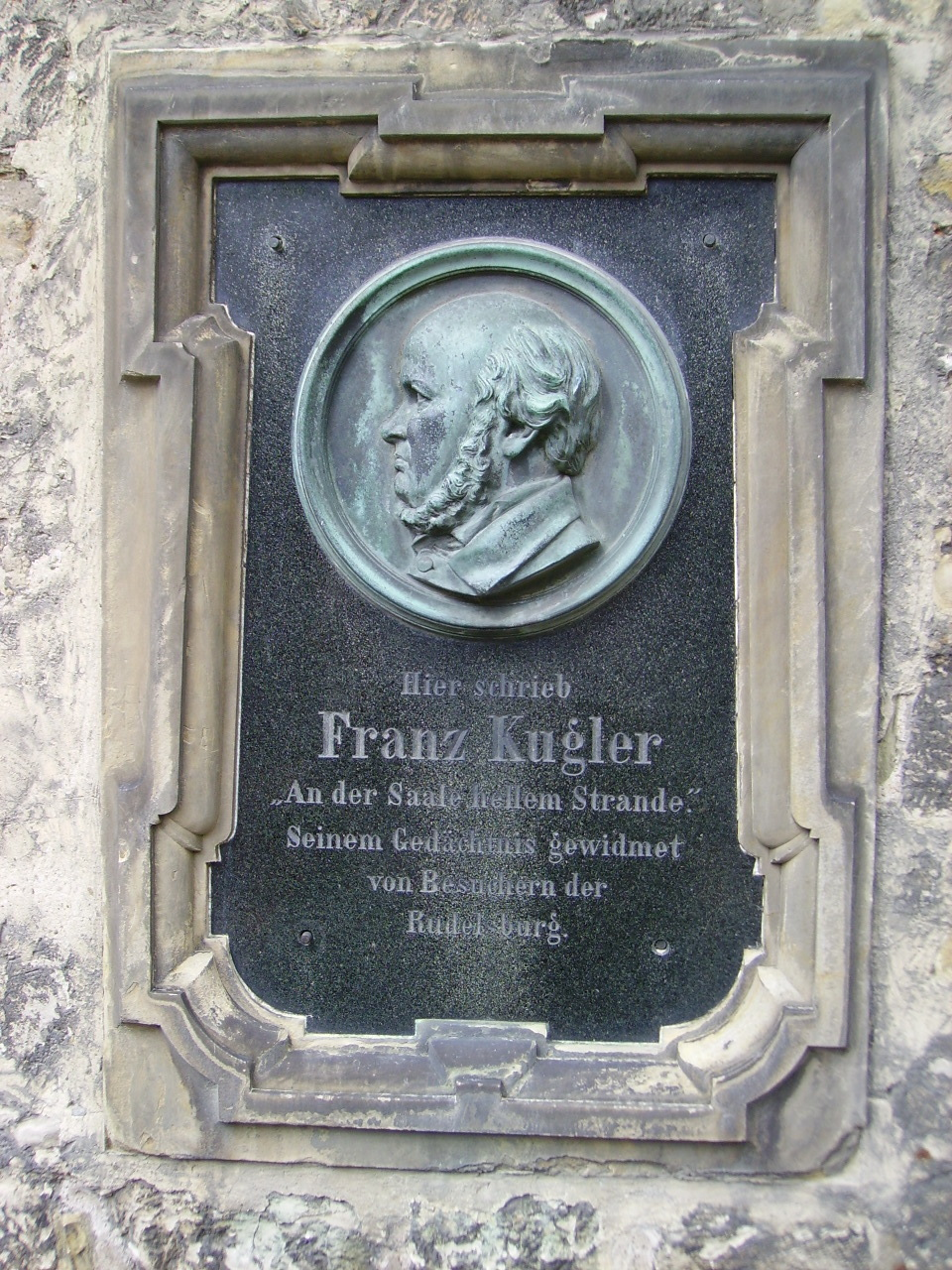
Kugler memorial plaque at Rudelsburg castle

Franz Theodor Kugler (19 January 1808, Stettin – 18 March 1858, Berlin) was an art historian and cultural administrator for the Prussian state. He was the father of historian Bernhard von Kugler (1837–1898).

He studied literature, music and the visual arts at the University of Berlin. After attending classes in Heidelberg, he returned to Berlin in 1827 in order to study architecture. In 1831 he obtained his doctorate under Ernst Heinrich Toelken with a dissertation on Werinher of Tegernsee. In 1833 he was appointed professor of art history at the Prussian Academy of Arts in Berlin, and ten years later, was named to the Ministry of Culture, from which he served as an overseer of Prussian art. Cultural historian, Jakob Burckhardt, was a prominent student of his.

In 1837 he released his "Handbuch der Geschichte der Malerei" (2 volumes), and a few years later, he published the acclaimed "Handbuch der Kunstgeschichte", a comprehensive survey of world art. He was also the author of a biography on Frederick the Great, "Geschichte Friedrichs des Großen" (1840) and of a monograph on architect Karl Friedrich Schinkel (1842).

From 1833 to 1837, he was editor of the journal "Museum, Blätter für bildende Kunst". Johannes Brahms employed text written by Kugler for his Ständchen ("Der Mond steht über dem Berge"), a song for voice and piano, Op. 106/1.

== Literary works ==
- Skizzenbuch, Berlin 1830
- Liederbuch für deutsche Künstler, 1833 (with Robert Reinick) – Song book for German artists.
- Die Bilderhandschrift der Eneidt, 1834 – The illuminated manuscript of Eneidt.
- Handbuch der Geschichte der Malerei, 2 Vols., 1837 – Handbook on the history of painting.
- Geschichte Friedrichs des Großen, (with Adolph Menzel) Leipzig 1840 – History of Frederick the Great.
- Handbuch der Kunstgeschichte, 2 Vols., Stuttgart, 1841 & 1842 – Handbook of art history.
- Kleine Schriften und Studien zur Kunstgeschichte, 1853 – Smaller works and studies of art history.
- Geschichte der Baukunst, 1856 – History of architecture.

Works by Franz Kugler that have been published in English

- "A hand-book of the history of painting : from the age of Constantine the Great to the present time", London : J. Murray, 1842-1846. (2 volumes).
- "History of Frederick the Great", London : G. Virtue, 1844.
- "Handbook of painting : the German, Flemish, Dutch, Spanish, and French schools" London : John Murray, 1854. 2 volumes (translated by Margaret Hutton).
- "Handbook of painting: the Italian schools. Based on the Handbook of Kugler". London, J. Murray, 1874 (4th edition).
- "Life of Frederick the Great, comprehending complete history of the Silesian campaigns and the seven years' war", New York, The Perkins Book Company, 1902 (an introduction by G. Mercer Adam).
