= Kunst und Künstler =

German periodical

Kunst und Künstler: illustrierte Monatsschrift für bildende Kunst und Kunstgewerbe was a German periodical, that shaped the reception of art during the first third of the 20th century. It was in circulation between 1902 and 1933.

== History ==
Founded by Bruno Cassirer in Berlin-Tiergarten as probably his best-known publication, the monthly soon became the most influential publication for the art-interested public. It appeared from volume 1 (1902/03) to volume 32 (1933) under the initial editorship of Emil Heilbut and Cäsar Flaischlen. From 1907 it was edited by the art critic and publicist Karl Scheffler, a committed advocate of contemporary European art. Thanks in part to his journalistic influence, the art movement of Impressionism, which was still highly controversial in Germany in the years before World War I, was increasingly accepted by the public of the time.

In terms of content, the magazine was devoted exclusively to the visual arts, publishing primarily reviews and critiques of works that were simultaneously printed as reproductions in the issues. Illustrations and original prints by participating artists such as Arnold Böcklin, Anselm Feuerbach, Max Klinger, Max Liebermann, Giovanni Segantini, Max Slevogt, Hans Thoma, Wilhelm Trübner, and Karl Walser, some of whom also appeared as authors, marked the special feature of this periodical. In addition, contributions on art history, art theory, and scientific topics by renowned experts appeared regularly; the number and significance of which ensured the lasting reputation and success of this monthly magazine and document its standing to this day.

After the Nazis seized power, the journal was discontinued. The last issue was published in January 1933.

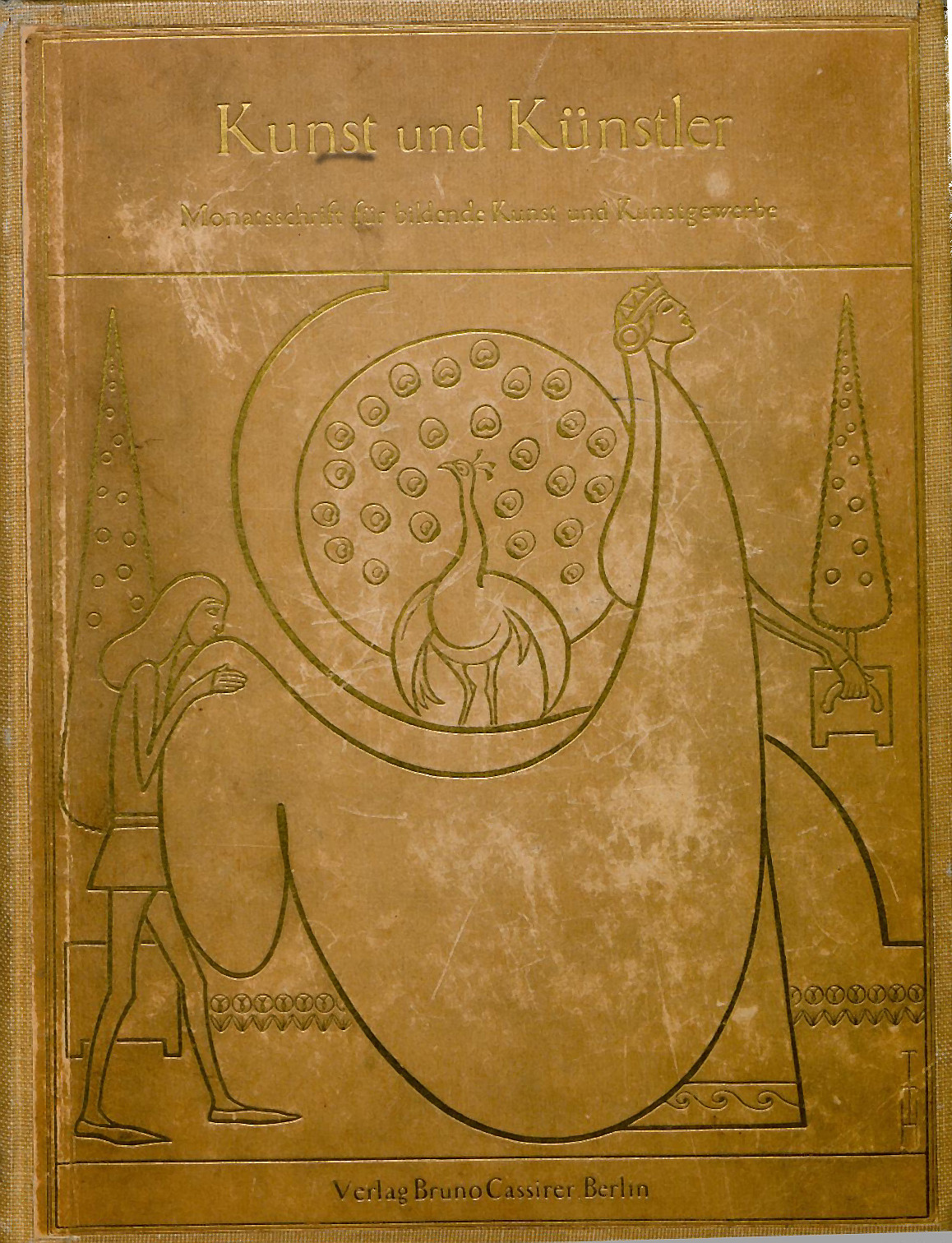
Front Cover, 1902 (by Thomas Theodor Heine)

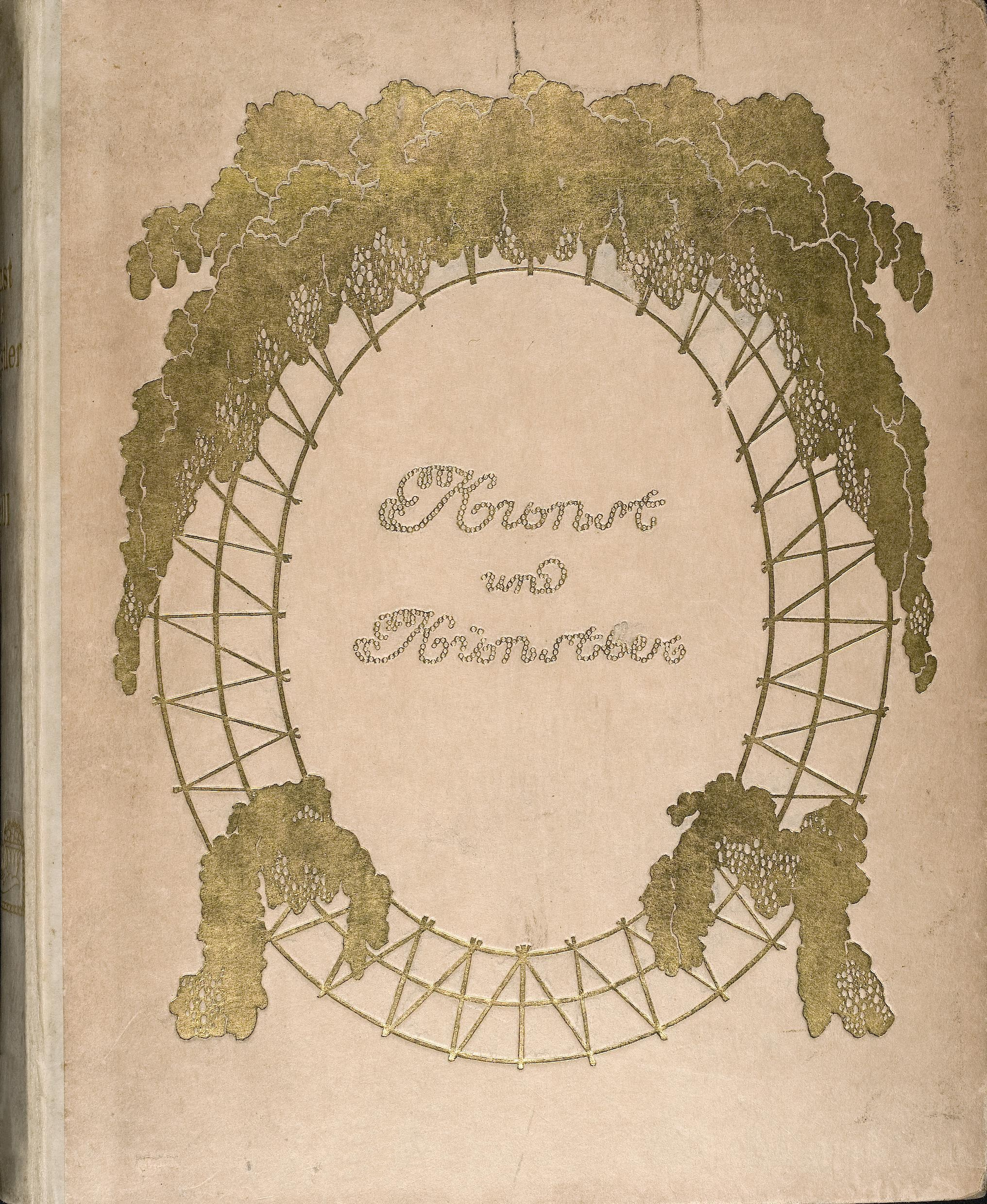
Front Cover, 1924

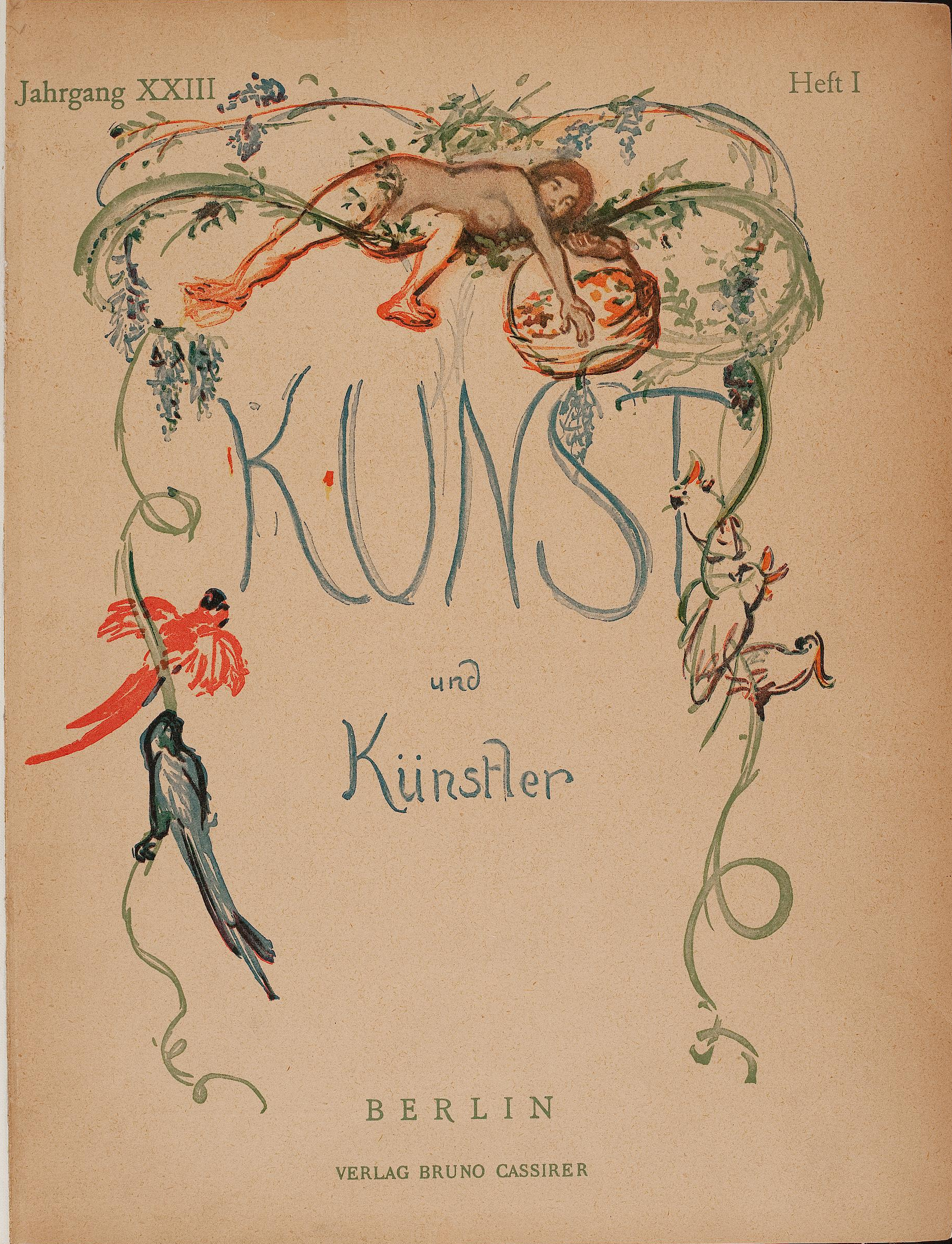
Title Page, 1925
(by Max Slevogt)

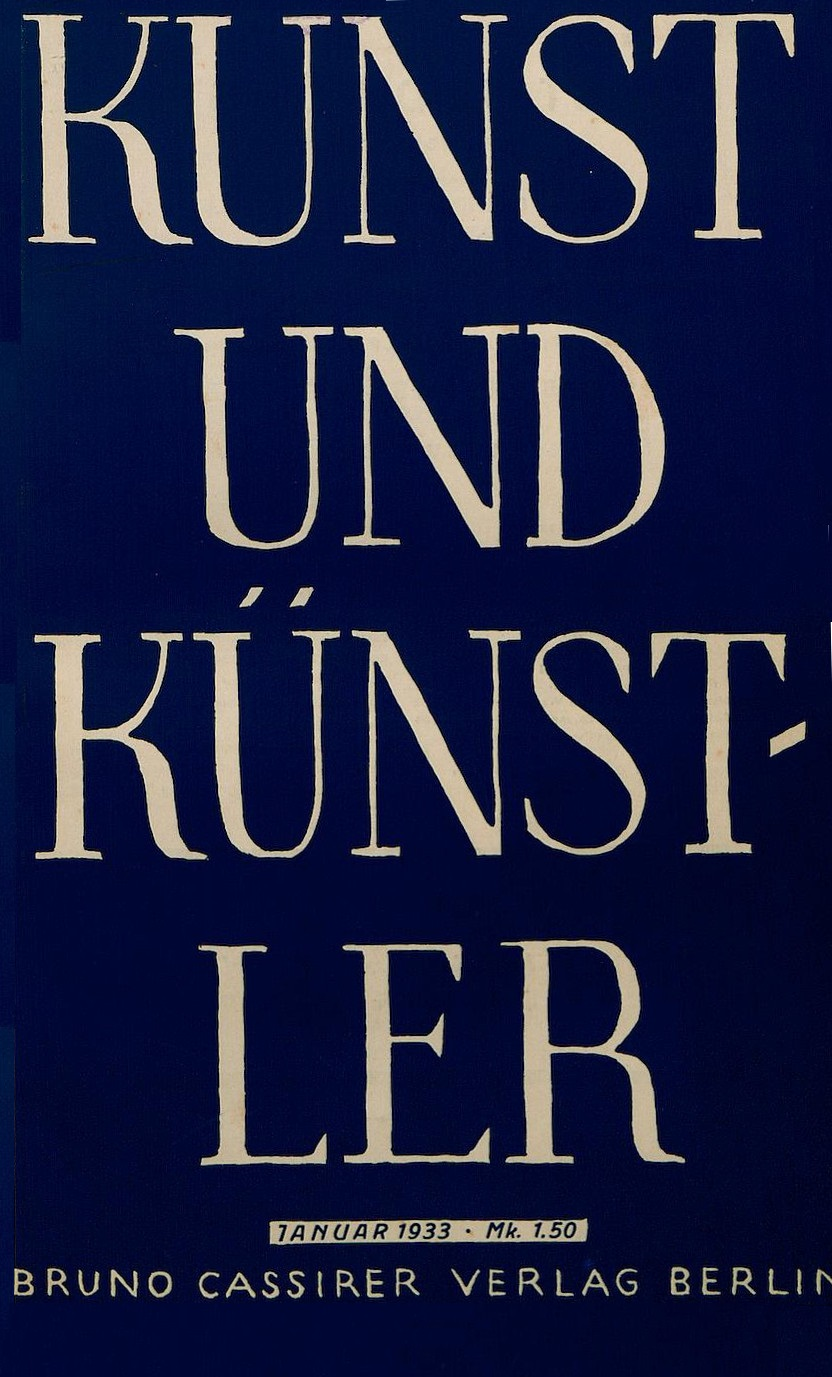
Last Title Page, 1933

== Authors ==
In the course of its 31 years of publication, around 350 authors contributed to the magazine.

A

- Paul Adler
- Friedrich Ahlers-Hestermann
- Wilken von Alten
- Walter Andrae
- Hans Ankwicz-Kleehoven
- Andreas Aubert
- Julius Aufseesser (1878–1942)

B

- Ludwig Bachhofer (1894–1976)
- Bernhard Baer (1905–1983)
- Gustav Barthel (1903–1973)
- Otto Bartning
- Adolphe Basler
- Hermann Beenken
- Ida Beer-Walbrunn
- Walter Curt Behrendt
- Otto Benesch
- Ernst Benkard
- Émile Bernard
- Ignaz Beth
- Hans Bethge
- André Beaunier
- Kurt Biebrach (1882–19??)
- Justus Bier
- Vitale Bloch (1900–1975)
- Elfried Bock (1880–1960)
- Wilhelm von Bode
- Max von Boehn
- Hans Börger (1880–1971)
- Walter Bombe (1873–1946)
- Walter Bondy
- Ludwig Borchardt
- Wolfgang Born (1893–1949)
- Ludwig Burchard
- Georg Brandes
- Max Braumann (1880–1969)
- Robert Breuer
- Albert E. Brinckmann
- Justus Brinckmann
- Wolfgang Bruhn
- Heinrich Bulle

C

- Charles Camoin
- Maxime Du Camp
- Carl Capek
- Eugène Carrière
- Walter Cohen
- William Cohn
- Lovis Corinth
- Edward Gordon Craig

D

- Robert Dangers
- Theodor Demmler
- Maurice Denis
- Werner R. Deusch
- Victor Dirksen
- Walter Dittmann
- Albert Dresdner
- Marie Dormoy
- Friedrich Dörnhöffer
- Théodore Duret

E

- Kurt Karl Eberlein
- Rudolph Eberstadt
- Hans Eckstein
- Mussia Eisenstadt
- Max Eisler (1881–1937)
- Bruno Eisner (1884–1978)
- Julius Elias
- Alexander Eliasberg
- August Endell
- Julius Engel
- Paul Ernst
- Herbert Eulenberg

F

- Hans von Faber du Faur
- Otto von Falke
- Hedwig Fechheimer
- Paul Fechter
- Arnold Federmann
- Conrad Felixmüller
- Karl Figdor
- Oskar Fischel
- Adolf Fischer
- Otto Fischer
- Theodor Fontane
- K. Fried
- Max Friedländer
- Walter Friedlaender
- Fritz Friedrichs
- Efraim Frisch

G

- Hermann Ganz
- Gustave Geffroy
- Hermann Gehri
- Oscar Gehrig
- Willi Geiger
- Kurt Gerstenberg
- Otto Gerstenberg
- Curt Glaser
- Heinrich Glück
- Erhard Göpel
- Alfred Gold
- Adolph Goldschmidt
- Botho Graef
- Robert Graf
- Richard Graul
- Otto Grautoff
- Curt Gravencamp
- August Griesebach
- Rudolf Grossmann
- Ernst Grosse
- George Grosz
- Ludwig Grote
- Cornelius Gurlitt

H

- Hugo Haberfeld
- Curt Habicht
- Hugo Häring
- Karl Hagemeister
- Richard Hamann
- Erich Hancke (1871–1954)
- Ernst Harms
- Gustav Friedrich Hartlaub
- Gerhart Hauptmann
- Wilhelm Hausenstein
- Emil Heilbut
- Thomas Theodor Heine
- Anna Wertheimer
- Gottfried Heinersdorff
- Carl Georg Heise
- Fritz Hellwag (1871–1950)
- Paul Henning
- Elisbeth Henschel-Simon (1897–1946)
- Wolfgang Herrmann
- Eduard Heyck
- Alfred Walter Heymel
- Hans Hildebrandt
- Ludwig Hilberseimer
- Marlice Hinz (1903–19??)
- Dora Hitz
- Heinrich Höhn (1881–1942)
- Otto Höver
- Hugo von Hofmannsthal
- Ernst Hohenemser (1870–1954)
- Arthur Holitscher
- Walter Hugelshofer (1899–1987)
- Hans Huth (1892–1977)

I

- Jozef Israëls

J

- Karl Wilhelm Jähnig (1888–1960)
- Hans Jantzen
- Georges Jeanniot
- Gotthard Jedlicka
- Peter Jessen
- André Jolles

K

- Hans Karlinger
- Hans Kauffmann
- Hugo Kehrer
- Martin Kessel
- Harry Kessler
- Ellen Key
- Eduard von Keyserling
- Hermann Graf Keyserling
- J. Kirchner
- Erich Klossowski
- Kurt Kluge
- Karl Koch
- Karl Koetschau
- Eduard Kolloff
- Christian Koren-Wiberg
- Siegfried Kracauer
- Paul Kristeller
- Alfred Kubin
- Ernst Kühnel
- Otto Kümmel
- Alfred Kuhn
- Kurt Kusenberg

L

- Jules Laforgue
- Albert Lamm
- Franz Landsberger
- Carl Larsson
- C. I. Lauweriks
- Julius Levin
- Alfred Lichtwark
- Max Liebermann
- Helmuth Liesegang
- Carl Linfert
- Frits Lugt
- Joseph August Lux
- Eugen Lüthgen

M

- Dugald Sutherland MacColl
- Hans Mackowsky
- Paul Mahlberg
- Klaus Mann
- Günther Martin (1896–1944)
- Kurt Martin
- Roger Marx
- Anton Mayer
- Margarete Mauthner (trans)
- August Liebmann Mayer
- J. Mayr
- Hans Meid
- Ludwig Meidner
- Julius Meier-Graefe
- Peter Meyer
- Max Meyerfeld
- Paul Friedrich Meyerheim
- Ernst Michalski (1901–1936)
- Leo Michelson
- Wilhelm Modersohn
- George Augustus Moore
- Christian Morgenstern
- Ludwig Moser
- Thomas Muchall-Viebrook
- Konrad Müller-Kaboth
- Hermann Muthesius

N

- Fritz Neugass
- Carl Neumann
- Alfred Neumeyer
- Georg Nordensvan

O

- Emil Orlik
- Karl Ernst Osthaus
- Konrad Ott

P

- Walter Paatz
- Gustav Pauli
- Anton von Perfall
- Eduard Plietzsch (1886–1961)
- Otto Pniower
- Georg Poensgen
- Josef Ponten
- Josef Poppelreuter
- Felix Poppenberg
- Leó Popper
- Hans Posse
- Hermann Post
- Emil Preetorius
- Antonin Proust
- Heinrich Pudor
- Hans Purrmann

R

- Louis Réau
- Heribert Reiners
- Paul Renner
- Magda Révész-Alexander (1885–1972)
- Fritz Rhein
- Richard Riemerschmid
- Rainer Maria Rilke
- Grete Ring
- Arthur Roessler
- Franz Roh
- Johan Rohde (1856–1935)
- Jakob Rosenberg
- Hans Rosenhagen
- Severin Rüttgers
- Udo Rukser
- Fritz Rumpf

S

- Friedrich Sarre
- Max Sauerlandt
- Karl Schaefer
- Hans Otto Schaller
- Rosa Schapire
- Karl Scheffler
- Gustav Schiefler
- Hermann Schlittgen
- Paul Ferdinand Schmidt
- Robert Schmidt
- Karl Schmidt-Hellerau
- Hermann Schmitz
- Karl Schnaase
- Arthur von Schneider (1886–1968)
- Ludwig Schnorr von Carolsfeld
- W. Scholz
- Bruno Schröder
- Anna Schubert
- Edmund Schüler (1873–1953)
- Marie Schuette
- Wolfgang Schütz
- Richard L.F. Schulz
- Ernst Schur
- Günther Schwark
- Max Schwimmer
- Richard Sedlmaier
- Richard Seewald
- Woldemar von Seidlitz
- Seiffert-Wattenberg
- Franz Servaes
- Oswald Sickert
- Hans Wolfgang Singer
- Alfred Sisley
- Max Slevogt
- Fritz Stahl
- Kurt Steinbart
- Walter Stengel
- Jan Benno Stokvis
- Georg Swarzenski
- Eckart von Sydow (1885–1942)
- Ladislas Szecsi
- Felix Szkolny

T

- Werner Technau
- Edith von Térey
- Gabriel von Térey
- Heinrich Tessenow
- Jens Thiis
- Hans Tietze
- Erica Tietze-Conrat
- Georg Treu
- Hugo Troendle
- Johannes Trojan
- Wilhelm Trübner
- Hugo von Tschudi

U

- Hermann Ubell
- Hermann Uhde-Bernays
- Otto Unrein
- Emil Utitz

V

- Wilhelm Reinhold Valentiner
- Henry van de Velde
- Louis Vauxelles
- Jan Veth
- Robert Vischer
- Karl Voll
- Ambroise Vollard
- Hans Vollmer
- Hermann Voss

W

- Wilhelm Waetzoldt
- Emil Waldmann
- Ernst Waldschmidt
- Victor Wallerstein
- Robert Walser
- George Frederic Watts
- Hermann von Wedderkop
- Ernst Weil (1891–1965)
- Kurt Wehlte
- Werner Weisbach
- Heinrich Weizsäcker
- Hans Wendland
- Otto Wenzel
- Paul Wescher
- Fritz Wichert
- Richard Wilde
- Franz Winter
- Fritz Witte
- Heinrich Wölfflin
- Willi Wolfradt
- Wilhelm Worringer
- Ernst Würtenberger

Z

- Christian Zervos
- Heinrich Zille
- Otto Zoff
- Paul Zucker
