= Hans Mackowsky =

German art historian (1871–1938)

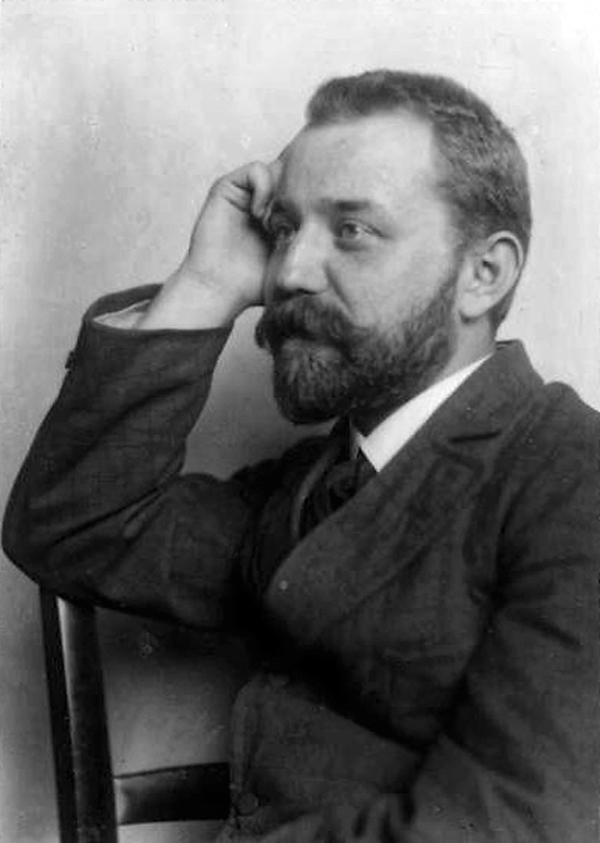
- Born: 19 November 1871; Berlin, German Empire
- Died: 18 July 1938 (aged 66); Potsdam, Germany
- Occupation: art historian

Hans Mackowsky (19 November 1871, Berlin – 18 July 1938, Potsdam) was a German art historian.

Hans Mackowsky studied art history in Berlin and Freiburg, receiving his doctorate in 1893 at Berlin. From 1896 to 1900 he was a research assistant at the Gemäldegalerie, Berlin. He then studied in Florence for two years, later becoming a private scholar in Berlin. From 1905 Mackowsky wrote for the art magazine Kunst und Künstler published by Bruno Cassirer. From 1908 he was a lecturer at the Humboldt-Akademie (Humboldt Academy), and the privately run Lessing-Hochschule (Lessing University) in Berlin. In 1909 he became a professor, and in 1912 director of the Christian Daniel Rauch Museum, part of the National Gallery of Berlin, on Klosterstrasse, and from the early 1930s in the Orangery wing of Charlottenburg Palace In 1914 he became assistant director at the National Gallery, and from 1916 worked there as curator. The life work of the sculptor Johann Gottfried Schadow formed the focus of his research. Mackowsky made a name for himself as the author and editor of books on important artists from the 18th to the 20th century, and as a museum guide.

Karl Scheffler wrote about Mackowsky in his memoirs in 1946:

He was the best connoisseur of old Berlin, but because of all his studies, it was not easy for him to write. For years he could hunt for a single historical fact that he still lacked; he preferred to leave almost finished works lying around than to publish them without final nuances. In everything he made life difficult for himself and thus also made it difficult for editors. But what he gave was reliable as pure gold. At all times he was a collaborator whose contributions were like gifts, but who wanted to be treated with the utmost care, for he had the trait of many physically small men: they become aggressive out of defensiveness.

Hermann von Wedderkop described Hans Mackowsky as the best connoisseur of little known Berlin and dedicated his book Das unbekannte Berlin (The Unknown Berlin) to him. Franz Hessel paid tribute to Mackowsky in his book Spazieren in Berlin (Walking in Berlin):

You will find Berlin romanticism in the landscape paintings of the great Schinkel, who was actually not a painter but a master builder. He painted them for one of the old patrician houses in the Brüderstraße and if you have the time, read what Hans Mackowski writes about it in his Houses and People in Old Berlin and continue reading what he reports about this house and others, that will build a bygone city in the present

Mackowsky became a victim of the Nuremberg Laws during the Nazi era because of his parentage. Wolf Jobst Siedler recalled in 2004 that he "met a sad and lonely end in 1938 because he was a Jew". Hans Mackowsky died at Potsdam on 18 July 1938 and was buried in Bornstedter Cemetery. Mackowsky's widow, Else who lived until 1950, published new editions of his books after his death.

== Selected publications ==
- Die Bildwerke Gottfried Schadows, with an introduction by Paul Ortwin Rave, Deutscher Verein für Kunstwissenschaft, Berlin 1951
- Schadows Graphik in Forschungen zur deutschen Kunstgeschichte, band 19, Deutscher Verein für Kunstwissenschaft, Berlin 1936.
- Michelangelo, Stammtafeln, Quellen und Literatur sowie Register, appendices "verschollene, zweifelhafte and unechte Arbeiten" Cassirer, Berlin 1931
- Johann Gottfried Schadow. Jugend und Aufstieg 1764 bis 1797, Grote, Berlin 1927
- Häuser und Menschen im alten Berlin, Cassirer, Berlin 1923
- Adolph Menzel. Die Soldaten Friedrichs des Großen. introduced and explained by Hans Mackowsky. Seemann, Leipzig 1923
- Karl Friedrich Schinkel. Briefe, Tagebücher, Gedanken, selected, introduced and explained by Hans Mackowsky, Propyläen, Berlin 1922
- Im Abendrot. Gedichte, Eduard Stichnote, Potsdam, 1920
- Das schöne Buch im alten Berlin, in Almanach des Verlages Bruno Cassirer, Berlin 1920
  - reprint Das schöne Buch im alten Berlin, Freundesgabe für die Mitglieder des Berliner Bibliophilen Abends, Berlin 1994
- Das Alt-Berliner Grabmal 1750 bis 1850. Hundert Aufnahmen und Vermessungen – kunstgeschichtlich eingeleitet von Hans Mackowsky with Wolfgang Schütz, Cassirer, Berlin 1918
- Christian Daniel Rauch: 1777 to 1857. Cassirer, Berlin 1916
  - reprint Propyläen, Frankfurt, Berlin, Vienna 1981 ISBN 978-3-549-06655-3
- Michelangniolo, Marquardt, Berlin 1908, and Cassirer 1919, 1921
  - and Cassirer 1925, 1931 under title Michelangelo
    - and Metzler 1939, 1941, 1947, 1951
- Adolph Bayersdorfers Leben und Schriften. Aus seinem Nachlass herausgegeben, ed. August Pauly and Wilhelm Weigand, Bruckmann, Munich 1902
- Verrocchio, Velhagen & Klasing, Bielefeld and Leipzig 1901.
