= Curt Glaser =

American art historian (1879–1943)

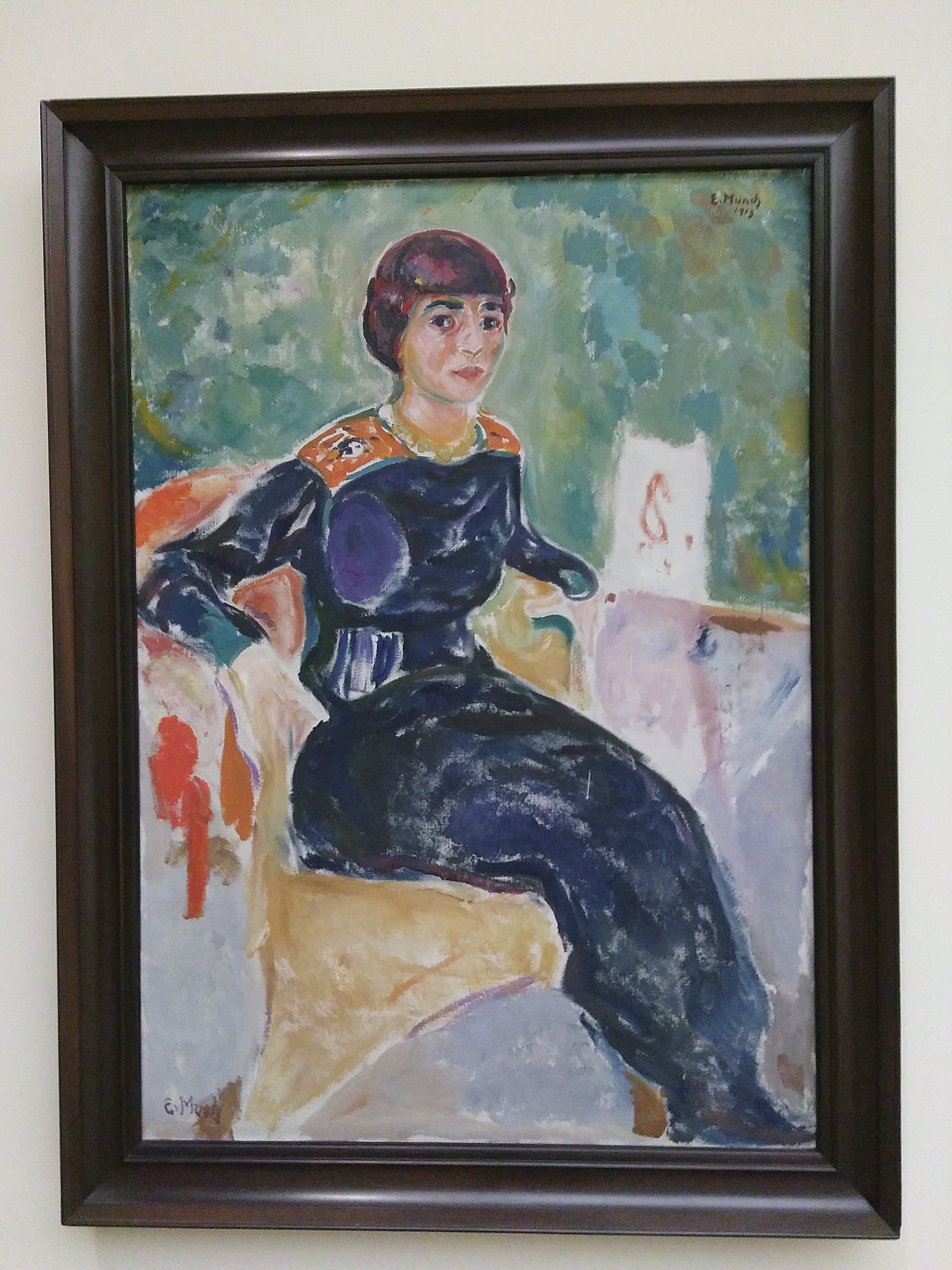
Portrait of Else Glaser (wife of Curt Glaser) by Edvard Munch

Curt Glaser (May 29, 1879 (Leipzig) – November 23, 1943 (Lake Placid, New York, USA)) was a German Jewish art historian, art critic and collector who was persecuted by the Nazis.

== Life ==
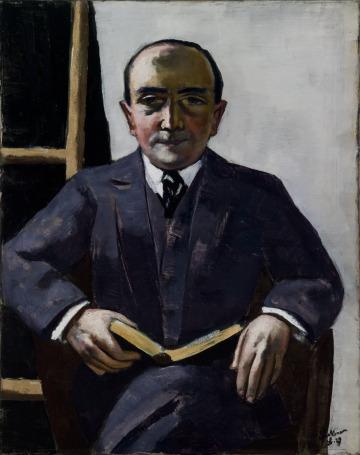
Portrait of Max Beckmann (1929)

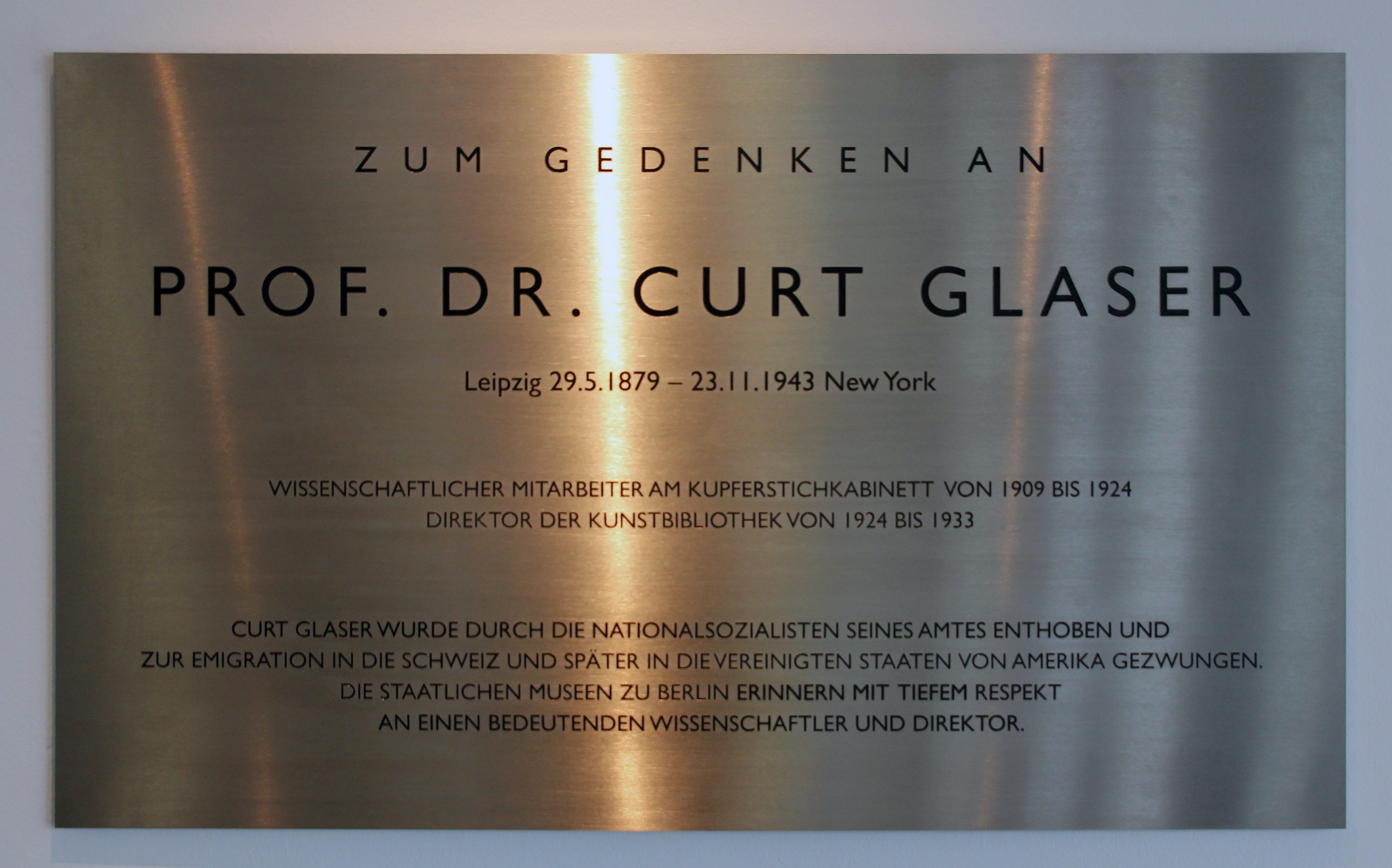
Gedenktafel, Matthäikirchplatz 8, in Berlin-Tiergarten

Glaser's parents, the businessman Simon Glaser (1841–1904) and his wife Emma Glaser, née Haase (1854–1927), moved to Berlin soon after their son was born. Glaser, born of the Jewish faith, converted to the Protestant faith around 1911. He had two brothers, the physician Felix Glaser (1874–1931) and the art dealer Paul Glaser (1885–1946).

Curt Glaser received his doctorate in medicine in Munich in 1902 and then began studying art history in Freiburg, Munich, and Berlin, where he worked with Heinrich Wölfflin in 1907 with a thesis on Hans Holbein the Elder.

In 1903 he married Elsa Kolker from Breslau († 1932), daughter of the industrialist and art collector Hugo Kolker, with whom he built up an important art collection including works by Max Beckmann, Ernst Ludwig Kirchner, Ernst Oppler, Henri Matisse and Edvard Munch.

As an art historian, he campaigned for the re-evaluation of old German art and, together with Karl Scheffler, edited the series Deutsche Meister, published by Insel Verlag. At the same time he dealt with contemporary art and is one of the early supporters of Expressionist art in Germany, as well as one of the first art scholars to deal with East Asian art.

In addition to his academic work, Glaser wrote regular art reviews for the daily newspaper Hamburgischer Correspondent from 1902 to 1910. From 1909 he contributed to the journal Kunst und Künstler published by Karl Scheffler and was also the Berlin editor of the Kunstchronik.

In 1924 Glaser became Director of the Berlin Staatlichen Kunstbibliothek [State Art Library].

From 1918 to 1933 he was the art reporter for the daily newspaper Berliner Börsen-Courier.

In 1933 he married Maria Milch (daughter: Eva Renate 1935–1943) .

== Nazi persecution ==
When the National Socialists took power, Glaser was persecuted because of his Jewish descent, and in June 1933, he emigrated to Switzerland. Before emigrating, he was forced to sell large parts of his collection below value through the Max Perl auction house.

The couple managed to emigrate to the USA via Cuba in 1941 and settled in New York. Glaser died in 1943 after a long illness without having found another professional foothold in exile.

== Claims for restitution ==
Glaser's descendants in Germany, Brazil and the US have successfully petitioned museums and private owners to return artworks. Cologne's Ludwig Museum and Amsterdam's Rijksmuseum have both restituted artworks.

In 2009 the UK Spoliation Advisory Committee considered a claim by Glaser's heirs against the Samuel Courtauld Trust (the Courtauld) for eight drawings acquired by Count Antoine Seilern (Seilern) at an auction of part of Glaser's collection held in Berlin in May 1933. The drawings were part of the Princes Gate bequest in 1978 to the Home House Society. The Glaser heirs contested the decision.

In 2012, Glazer's heirs and the Prussian Cultural Heritage Foundation reached an agreement on the division of the works of art held by the State Museums in Berlin from Glazer's property, which had been auctioned off at a lower price.

On May 9, 2016, a memorial plaque was unveiled in the Berlin Art Library, Berlin-Tiergarten, Matthäikirchplatz 8.

In 2008 Curt Glaser's heirs made a claim for restitution against the Basel art museum for more than100 drawings and prints, including works by Henri Matisse, Max Beckmann, Auguste Rodin, Marc Chagall, Oskar Kokoschka, Ernst Ludwig Kirchner and Erich Heckel. Among the most valuable pieces are two Munch lithographs, “Self Portrait” and “Madonna.” The Kustmuseum refused for more than a decade. However, after the Swiss news media unearthed documents that contradicted the museum's version of events, the museum reversed its position in 2020, agreeing to pay a settlement to Glaser's heir.

The German Lost Art Foundation lists 1806 objects that belonged to Glaser and his wife in its database.

== Writings ==
- Hans Holbein d.Ä. (= Kunstgeschichtliche Monographien 11). Hiersemann, Leipzig o. J.
- Die Kunst Ostasiens. Der Umkreis ihres Denkens und Gestaltens. Insel Verlag, Leipzig 1913
- Zwei Jahrhunderte deutscher Malerei. Von den Anfängen der deutschen Tafelmalerei im ausgehenden 14. Jahrhundert bis zu ihrer Blüte im beginnenden 16. Jahrhundert. Bruckmann, München 1916
- Edvard Munch. Cassirer, Berlin 1917
- Der Holzschnitt. Von seinen Anfängen im 15. Jahrhundert bis zur Gegenwart. Cassirer, Berlin 1920
- Vincent van Gogh (= Bibliothek der Kunstgeschichte 9). E. A. Seemann, Leipzig 1921
- Lukas Cranach. Deutsche Meister. Insel, Leipzig 1921 Glaser, Curt Lukas Cranach
- Die Graphik der Neuzeit. Vom Anfang des 19. Jahrhunderts bis zur Gegenwart. Cassirer, Berlin 1922
- Eduard Manet: Faksimiles nach Zeichnungen und Aquarellen. Veröffentlichungen der Marées-Gesellschaft. Piper, München 1922
- Gotische Holzschnitte. Propyläen, Berlin 1923
- Paul Cézanne (= Bibliothek der Kunstgeschichte 50). E. A. Seemann, Leipzig 1923
- Hans Holbein d. J. Zeichnungen. Schwabe, Basel 1924
- Die Altdeutsche Malerei. Bruckmann, München 1924
- Ostasiatische Plastik, Band 11: Die Kunst des Ostens. Hrsg. William Cohn. Cassirer, Berlin 1925
- Japanisches Theater. Würfel, Berlin 1930
- Les peintres primitifs allmands du milieu du XIV.e siècle à la fin du XVe. van Oest, Paris 1931
- Amerika baut auf! Cassirer, Berlin 1932
- Zu Besuch bei Edvard Munch in Ekely – 1927. Meyer, Basel 2007, ISBN 978-3-905799-01-9

== Literature ==
- Deutsche Ostasienwissenschaften und Exil (1933–1945). Curt Glaser * 29. Mai 1879 in Leipzig, † 23. November 1943 New York. Ein vorläufiges Schriftenverzeichnis. pp. 231–266.
- Glaser, Curt, in: Ulrike Wendland: Biographisches Handbuch deutschsprachiger Kunsthistoriker im Exil. Leben und Werk der unter dem Nationalsozialismus verfolgten und vertriebenen Wissenschaftler. München : Saur, 1999, ISBN 3-598-11339-0, S. 197–200
- Glaser, Curt. In: Lexikon deutsch-jüdischer Autoren. Band 9: Glas–Grün. Hrsg. vom Archiv Bibliographia Judaica. Saur, München 2001, ISBN 3-598-22689-6, S. 3–6.
- Curt Glaser. Kunsthistoriker, Kunstkritiker, Sammler. Eine deutsch-jüdische Biographie. Böhlau. 2006. ISBN 3-412-26305-2.
- Andreas Strobl: "Man bleibt mit Worten immer draußen". Curt Glaser – zwischen Kunstkritik und Sammellust. In: Aufbruch in die Moderne. Sammler, Mäzene und Kunsthändler in Berlin 1880–1933. Hrsg. von Anna-Dorothea Ludwig, Julius H. Schoeps, Ines Sonder, Mitarbeit Anna-Carolin Augustin. DuMont, Köln 201,2 ISBN 978-3-8321-9428-4.
- Curt Glaser. Historiker der ostasiatischen Kunst. Mit seinem nachgelassenen Werk "Materialien zu einer Kunstgeschichte des Quattrocento in Italien". Mit Einleitung, Schriftenverzeichnis und Register bearb. und hg. von Hartmut Walravens. Beiträge von Setsuko Kuwabara (= Staatsbibliothek zu Berlin. Neuerwerbungen der Ostasienabteilung, Sonderheft 31). Berlin 2012, ISBN 978-3-88053-183-3.
- Glaser, Curt, in: Joseph Walk (Hrsg.): Kurzbiographien zur Geschichte der Juden 1918–1945. München : Saur, 1988, ISBN 3-598-10477-4, S. 114
- Glaser, Curt, in: Werner Röder; Herbert A. Strauss (Hrsg.): International Biographical Dictionary of Central European Emigrés 1933-1945. Band 2,1. München : Saur, 1983 ISBN 3-598-10089-2, S. 379

== See also ==
- Aryanization
- The Holocaust in Germany
- List of claims for restitution for Nazi-looted art
- Spoliation Advisory Panel
