= Carl Joseph Begas =

German painter (1794–1854)

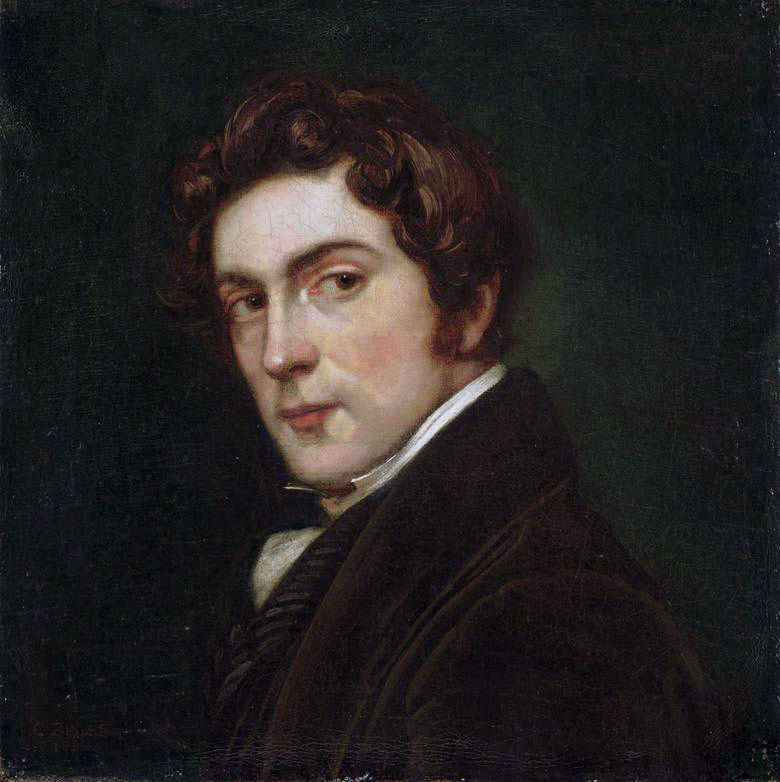
Self-portrait (1826)

Carl Joseph Begas, or Karl Begas (30 September 1794 – 24 November 1854), was a German painter who played an important role in the transition from Romanticism to Realism. He was the first in a multi-generational "dynasty" of artists.

== Life and work ==
He was born in Heinsberg. His family (originally "Begasse") came from Belgium, in the region near Verviers and Liège. He was the third child of Franz Anton Begasse (1764–1842), a judge, and his wife, Susanne née Hoffstadt. In 1802, they moved to Cologne, where he received his first artistic training from the miniaturist, Franz Katz. Later, he studied at the Lyceum in Bonn with Clemens August Philippart (1751–1825). In 1813, he went to Paris, where he became a student of Antoine-Jean Gros. While there, shortly after the Battle of Paris, his talent was noticed by King Friedrich Wilhelm III, who bought one of his works and became his patron. He remained in Paris until 1821. His first works dealt exclusively with Christian themes.

A scholarship made it possible for him to live in Italy from 1822 to 1825. There, he became associated with the Nazarene movement, and first began to sign his name as "Begas". In 1825, he moved to Berlin and married Wilhelmine Bock, daughter of the Master Builder, Johann Ludwig Bock. After that, he devoted himself primarily to portraits. Their home soon became a meeting place for Berlin's "high society". The following year, he was named a Professor at the Prussian Academy of Arts; a position he held until his death. Joseph Petzl was one of his best known students.

Around 1828, he came under the influence of the Düsseldorfer Malerschule and began to create works with historical and literary references, but always went back to portrait painting, largely for economic reasons. When the civilian order, Pour le Mérite, was established in 1843, he was commissioned to paint portraits of the medals' recipients, including the sculptors, Christian Daniel Rauch and Johann Gottfried Schadow, the philologist, Jakob Grimm, and the naturalist, Alexander von Humboldt. In 1846, King Friedrich Wilhelm IV appointed him Court Painter. He died in Berlin in 1854, at the age of sixty, after returning from a visit to Rome. Four of his sons also became artists.

== Family ==
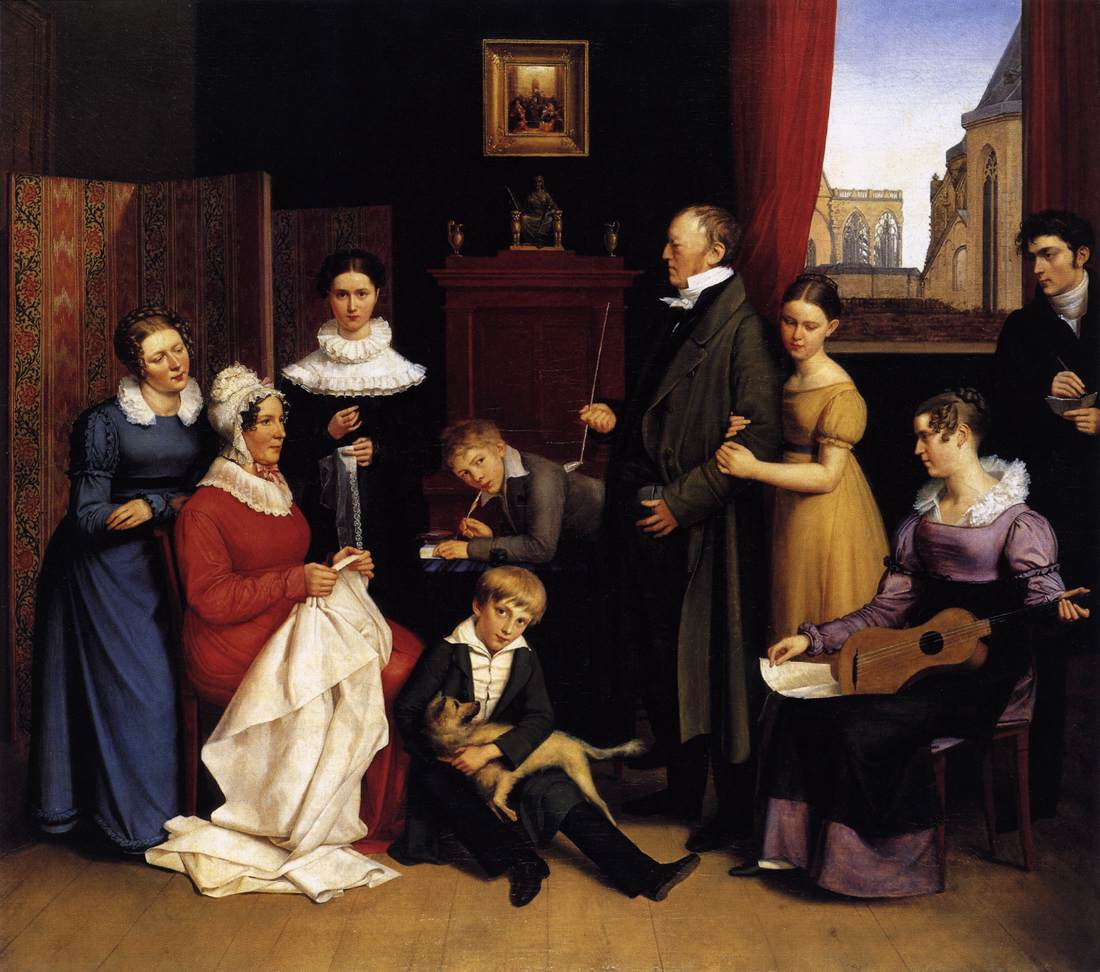
Portrait of the Begas family

Begas had eight children:

- Oskar Begas (1828–1883) portrait painter and professor at the Prussian Academy of Arts.
- Alfred Begas (1830–1860) officer.
- Reinhold Begas (1831–1911) sculptor, head of the Siegesallee project. Sculpted the Neptune Fountain (Berlin).
- Hellmuth Begas (1833–1893) officer.
- Veronika Begas (1834–1844)
- Adalbert Begas (1836–1888) painter, specializing in genre scenes.
- Susanne Begas (1839–1848)
- Karl Begas (1845–1916) sculptor.

== Sources ==
- "Бегас, Карл" . Brockhaus and Efron Encyclopedic Dictionary (in Russian). 1906.
- Hans Mackowsky, "Begas, Karl (Joseph)", In: Allgemeines Lexikon der Bildenden Künstler von der Antike bis zur Gegenwart, Vol. 3: Bassano–Bickham, Wilhelm Engelmann, Leipzig, 1909 (Online)
- Eberhard Ruhmer (1953). "Begas, Karl Joseph der Ältere". Neue Deutsche Biographie (in German). Vol. 1. Berlin: Duncker & Humblot. pp. 744–745. (full text online).
- Rita Müllejans-Dickmann, Dorothee Haffner, Udo Felbinger: Carl Joseph Begas (1794–1854). Blick in die Heimat, Exhibition catalog, Heinsberg, 1994 ISBN 978-3-925620-14-0
- Robert Dohme (1875). "Begas, Karl" . Allgemeine Deutsche Biographie (in German). Vol. 2. Leipzig: Duncker & Humblot. pp. 269–270.
- Rita Müllejans-Dickmann (2004). "BEGAS(SE), Carl Joseph". In Bautz, Traugott (ed.). Biographisch-Bibliographisches Kirchenlexikon (BBKL) (in German). Vol. 23. Nordhausen: Bautz. cols. 61–68. ISBN 3-88309-155-3.
