= Karl Scheffler =

German art historian (1869–1951)

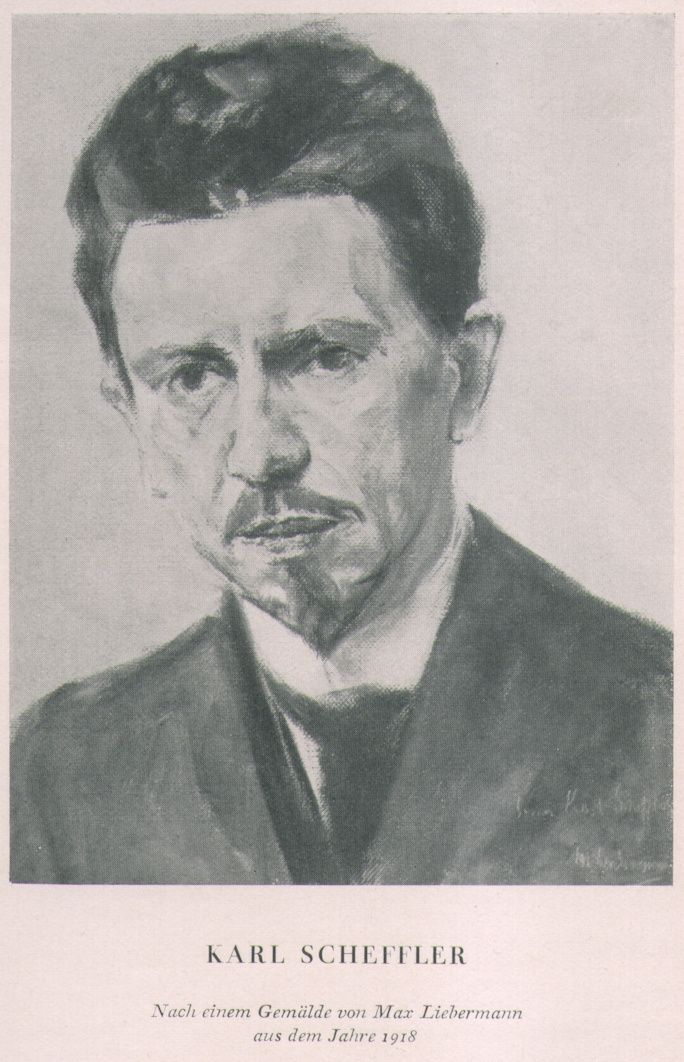
Karl Scheffler, by Max Liebermann, 1918

Karl Scheffler (17 February 1869 in Hamburg - 25 October 1951 in Überlingen) was a German art critic and publicist.

== Life ==
The son of the master painter John Scheffler first learned the painter's trade in the business of his uncle Claus August Meyer in Hamburg-Eppendorf. Together with his future wife Dora, née Bielefeld, he moved to Berlin at the beginning of the 1890s and attended the Kunstgewerbeschule there. From 1895 to 1906 he worked first as a decorative painter, later as an ornamental draftsman in a wallpaper factory. At the same time, he continued his self-taught education in the field of art history and soon turned to art journalism in addition to his day job. His first articles appeared in the late 1890s in Hans Rosenhagen's journal Das Atelier and in Maximilian Harden's Zukunft. Furthermore, beginning in 1897, Scheffler reported on the Berlin art scene in the renowned monthly magazine Dekorative Kunst, published by Julius Meier-Graefe. While he showed great interest in the representatives of the Arts and Crafts movement such as Henry van de Velde, Peter Behrens and August Endell, he was initially skeptical of the Berlin Secession. But from 1902/03 on, Scheffler became one of the most passionate defenders of German Impressionism and its protagonist Max Liebermann, about whom he also published a successful monograph in 1906. In addition, Scheffler repeatedly criticized the anti-modern Wilhelmine art policy and polemicized against the historically influenced academic art, which at that time set the tone especially for public building projects and monuments.

In 1906, Scheffler published Der Deutsche und seine Kunst (The German and His Art), his most combative plea to date for Impressionism as the definitive direction of modern art, which in many respects echoed Meier-Graefe's controversial Der Fall Böcklin (The Case of Böcklin), published shortly before. A short time later, he became editor-in-chief of the monthly magazine Kunst und Künstler, which was published by Bruno Cassirer in Berlin. Scheffler used the journalistic influence he now gained to publicly support his views on contemporary artistic and cultural issues time and again. In the years leading up to the First World War, his committed approach played a key role in helping the Impressionist art movement, which was still controversial in Germany at the time, to gain acceptance among the public. Scheffler was well aware of the polarizing power of art criticism, which he used for many years in his position as editor in chief of the widely read Vossische Zeitung.

Scheffler was increasingly critical of the avant guard in the years after the First World War. He argued with Ludwig Justi, the director of the National Gallery in Berlin and founder of the New Department in the Kronprinzenpalais; this dispute became known as the Berlin Museum War. Both used their respective journals (Justi edited Museum der Gegenwart) to defend their points of view.

When Hitler's National Socialists came to power in 1933, Scheffler's magazine Kunst und Künstler was discontinued. With the beginning of World War II, Scheffler retreated to Überlingen on Lake Constance. From there he gave numerous lectures in Switzerland, and in 1944 the University of Zurich honored him by awarding him the degree of doctor honoris causa. In 1948, the Technical University of Stuttgart also awarded him an honorary doctorate.

In honor of Karl Scheffler, there is a street in Hamburg called Schefflerweg.

== Reception ==
While Scheffler as a publicist had a significant influence on the art scene during the time of the Kaiserreich, his later writings in art criticism could be dismissive of avant-garde art in the 1920s. However his work covered a broad field: his essay volumes, travelogues, and autobiographical writings, most of which were published by Insel Verlag in Leipzig and S. Fischer Verlag, always attracted a wide readership. Even in the period after the Second World War, he once again achieved brief popularity before his death in 1951.

Scheffler's writings are frequently cited in connection with the history of the Berlin Secession to this day. He is considered an astute observer of modern metropolitan development (e.g., Die Architektur der Großstadt, 1913). In this context, his most important work, which is still widely read today, is his 1910 polemic Berlin - ein Stadtschicksal (Berlin - a City Fate), in which Scheffler not only settles accounts with Wilhelminism, but also interprets Berlin as a city structure devoid of tradition and stillness, whose characteristics are determined by a fundamental lack of organically grown structure. The book culminates in the famous final sentence: "Berlin does not want love from its inhabitants. If the spirit of the city is not deeply national, it is not sentimental either. As if with a joke of self-irony, this hard-determined city individual helps itself over the hidden tragedy of its existence (...) over the tragedy of a fate that (...) condemns Berlin to: perpetually becoming and never being." (p. 266f.) In 1931, under the title Berlin - Wandlungen einer Stadt (Berlin - Transformations of a City), Scheffler once again presented a fundamentally revised version of the book, with which he also took into account the most recent developments of the "New Berlin".

Referring to the famous quote, Harry Nutt regretted in 2005 in the Frankfurter Rundschau that Karl Scheffler's immense oeuvre is often reduced to a single sentence. After the Second World War, hardly anyone has taken up his critical and combative ethos as a writer. In 2015, Suhrkamp-Verlag published a new edition of Scheffler's Berlin book with a foreword by Florian Illies.

== Books (a selection) ==
- Der Deutsche und seine Kunst. Eine notgedrungene Streitschrift (1906)
- Max Liebermann (1906)
- Moderne Baukunst (1907)
- Die Frau und die Kunst (1908)
- Paris (1908, 2. Aufl. 1925)
- Idealisten (1909, online)
- Berlin. Ein Stadtschicksal (1910). Neuausgabe bei Suhrkamp, 2015
- Kritischer Führer durch die deutsche Nationalgalerie (1911)
- Henry van de Velde (1913)
- Italien. Tagebuch einer Reise (1913)
- Die Architektur der Großstadt (1913)
- Der Geist der Gotik (1917)
- Die Zukunft der deutschen Kunst (1918)
- Berliner Museumskrieg (1921)
- Deutsche Maler und Zeichner im neunzehnten Jahrhundert. Insel-Verlag, Leipzig (1923)
- Der Junge Tobias (1927, Lebenserinnerungen mit autobiographischen Charakter in dritter Person erzählt)
- Berlin. Wandlungen einer Stadt (1931)
- Die impressionistische Buchillustration in Deutschland (1931)
- Adolph Menzel. Paul List Verlag, Leipzig (1938)
- Deutsche Baumeister (1935)
- Lebensbild des Talents (1942)
- Die fetten und die mageren Jahre (1946), Autobiographie. Neuausgabe bei Nimbus, Wädenswil (CH) 2011, ISBN 9783907142585
- Verwandlungen des Barocks in der Kunst des neunzehnten Jahrhunderts (1947)
- Karl Scheffler: Stilmeierei oder neue Baukunst. Ein Panorama Berliner Architektur, hrsg. von Andreas Zeising, Berlin: Transit-Verlag, 2010
- Karl Scheffler: Essays – Gedanken über das Zweckfreie, Hörbuch-CD, Schondorf: Verlag Verena Franke, 2009

== Letters ==
- Briefe einer Freundschaft, Karl Scheffler-Gerhard Gollwitzer (1933–1951), hrsg. von Ernst Braun, Privatdruck München 2002
- Briefwechsel: Gerhard Marcks und Karl Scheffler. In: Sinn und Form, Heft 4/2007, S. 534–556.

== Literature ==
- Karl Scheffler: Das Erlebnis der Farbe. In: Architektur und Kunst. Band 32, 1945, S. 55–61.
- Michael Krejsa, Anke Matelowski: „… das Wort, dem alle Mühe galt: die Kunst“. Karl Scheffler (1869–1951). Akademie der Künste – Archiv, Berlin 2006 (= Archiv-Blätter. Band 15), ISBN 3-88331-095-6.
- Sigrun Paas: „Kunst und Künstler“, 1902–1933. Eine Zeitschrift in der Auseinandersetzung um den Impressionismus in Deutschland. Dissertation Heidelberg 1976.
- Andreas Zeising: Studien zu Karl Schefflers Kunstkritik und Kunstbegriff. Mit einer annotierten Bibliographie seiner Veröffentlichungen. Der Andere Verlag, Tönning u. a. 2006, ISBN 3-89959-515-7 (Zugleich: Dissertation Bochum 2001).

== Links ==
- Literature by and about Karl Scheffler in the German National Library catalogue
- Works by and about Karl Scheffler in the Deutsche Digitale Bibliothek (German Digital Library)
- Harry Nutt: Immerfort werden. Der Kunstkritiker Karl Scheffler. Frankfurter Rundschau vom 17. Februar 2005.
- Karl-Scheffler-Archiv im Archiv der Akademie der Künste, Berlin
- Karl Scheffler In: ETH Zürich, e-periodica
