= Oskar Begas =

German painter (1828–1883)

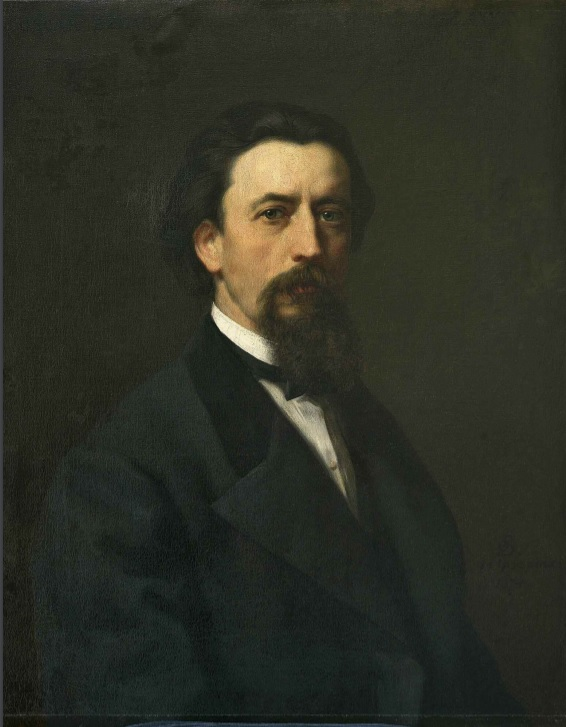
Self-portrait (1875)

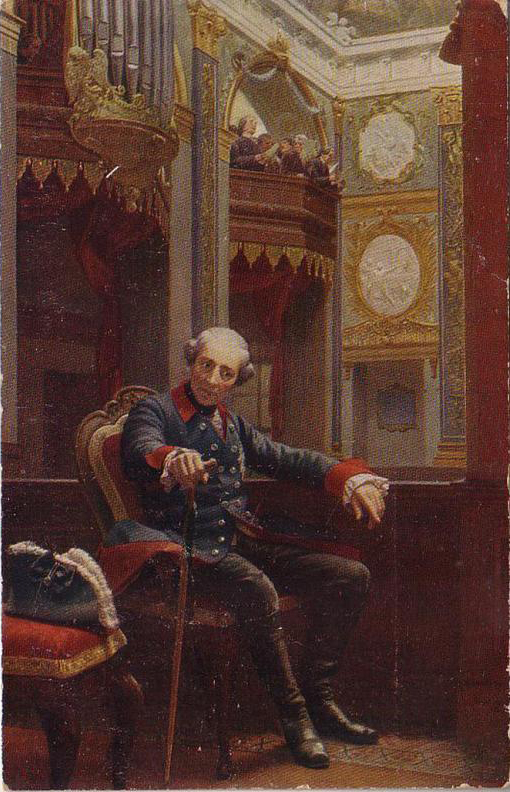
Frederick the Great in the chapel of Charlottenburg Palace (1868)

Oskar Begas (31 July 1828 – 10 November 1883) was a German portrait and history painter.

== Life and career ==
He was born in Berlin. He took his first lessons from his father, the well-known painter Carl Joseph Begas, and began by doing portraits of his family. He was soon collaborating on works with his father and, at the age of thirteen, received his first commission. Later, at the Prussian Academy of Arts, he specialized in history painting. From 1849 to 1850, he studied at the Dresden Academy of Fine Arts under Eduard Bendemann. He lived in Italy on a scholarship for two years, from 1852 to 1854.

He returned to Berlin after his father's death, completing an unfinished series of portraits depicting Knights who had received the Pour le Mérite. Afterwards, he received many of his own commissions from King Friedrich Wilhelm IV, producing portraits of Heinrich Friedrich Link, August Böckh, Johannes von Müller and Johann Lukas Schönlein, among others. In 1866, he was named a Professor at the Academy, remaining in demand and exhibiting widely. Toward the end of his life, he concentrated on landscapes. After his death in 1883, in Berlin, his style came to be considered rather formulaic.

Begas also did some decorative work, including lunettes in the Rotes Rathaus and small murals in the ballroom of the Kaisergallerie (a sort of early shopping mall) on Unter den Linden. Little of these remains, however. A detailed diary he kept from 1843 to 1848 has been of great use to cultural historians. The three-volume manuscript is in the collection of the Stiftung Stadtmuseum Berlin.

His brother Adalbert was also a painter. His brothers Karl and Reinhold were both sculptors.

== Gallery ==
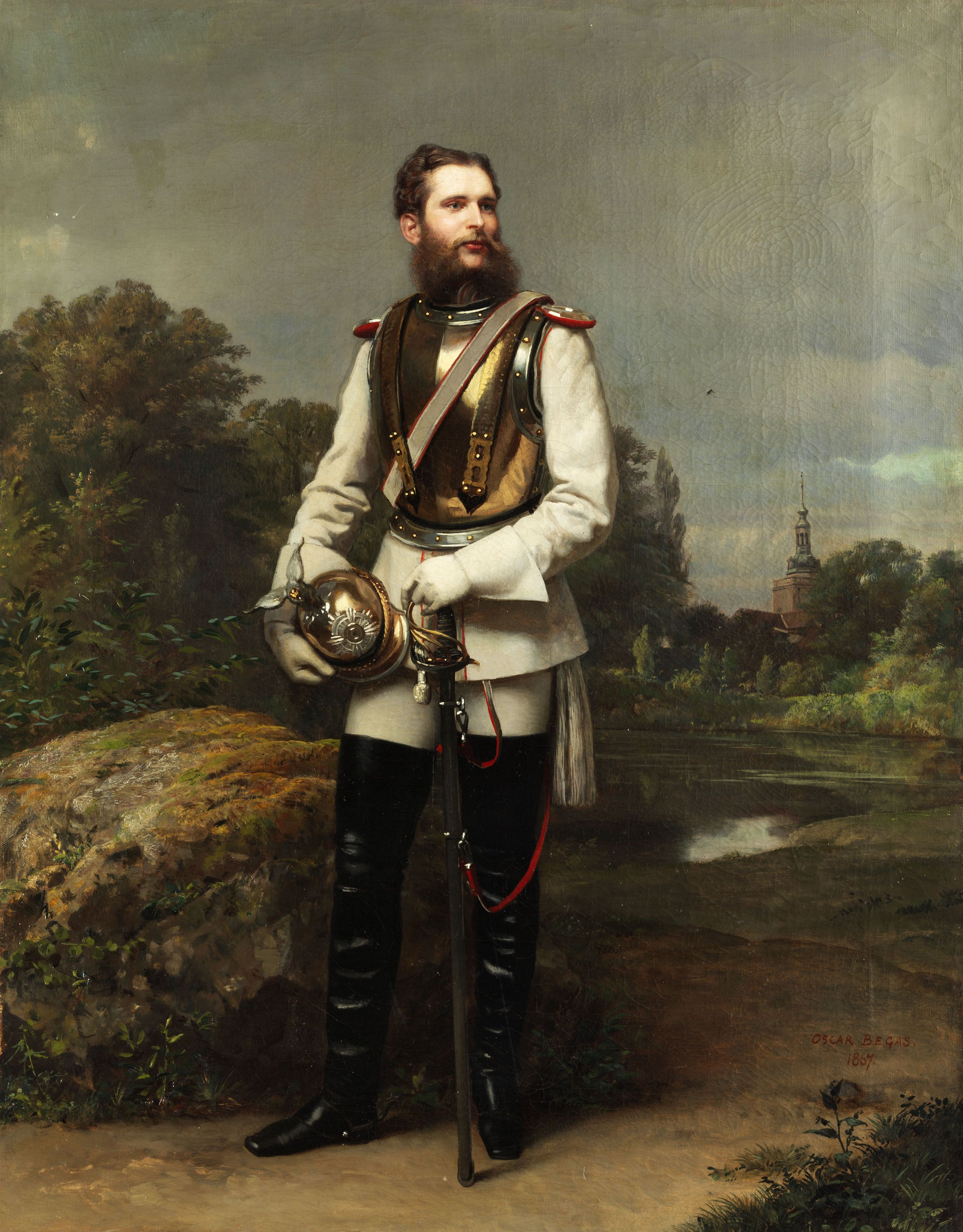
Crown Prince Friedrich Wilhelm of Prussia, 1867

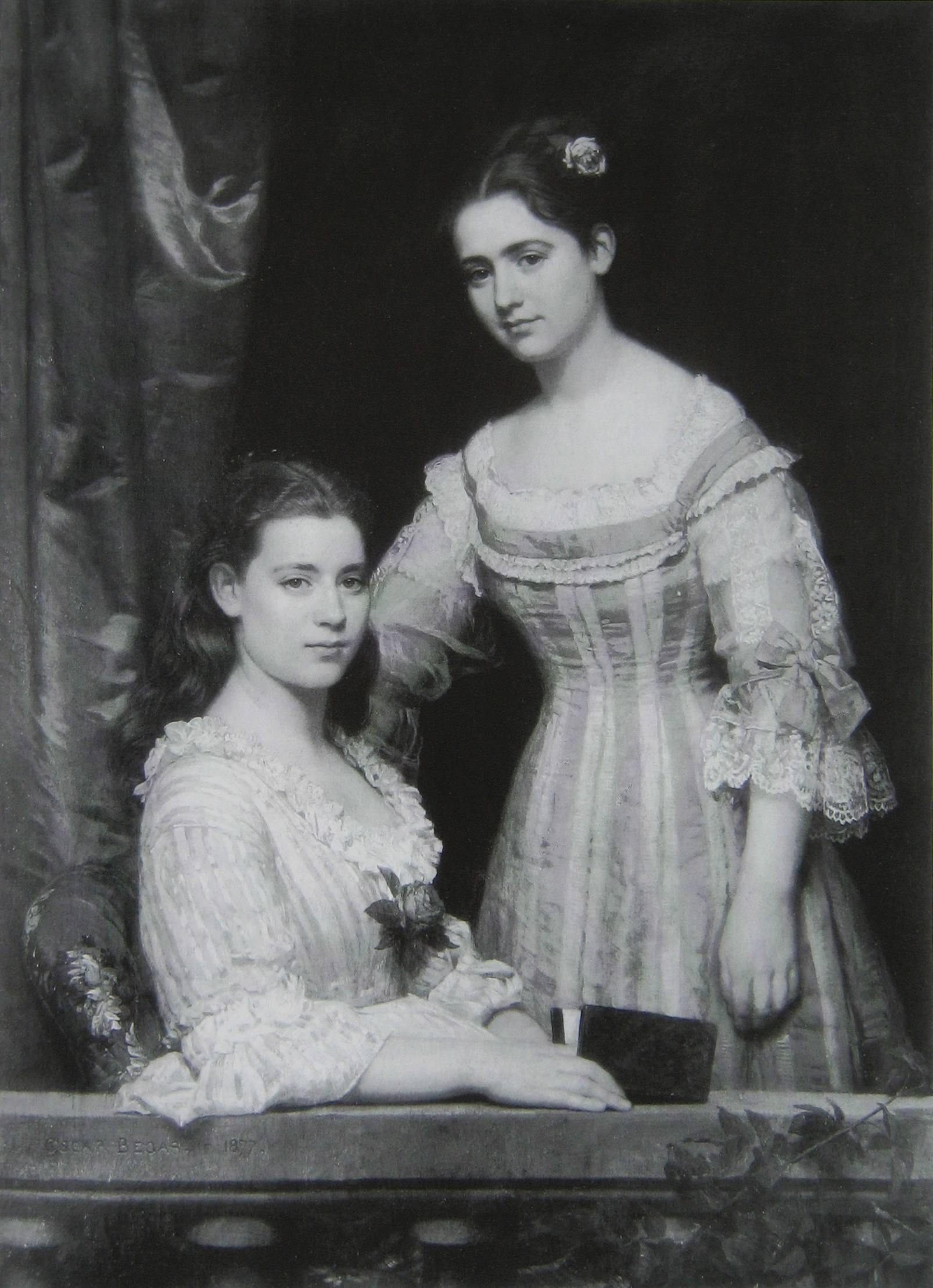
The artist's daughters, 1877

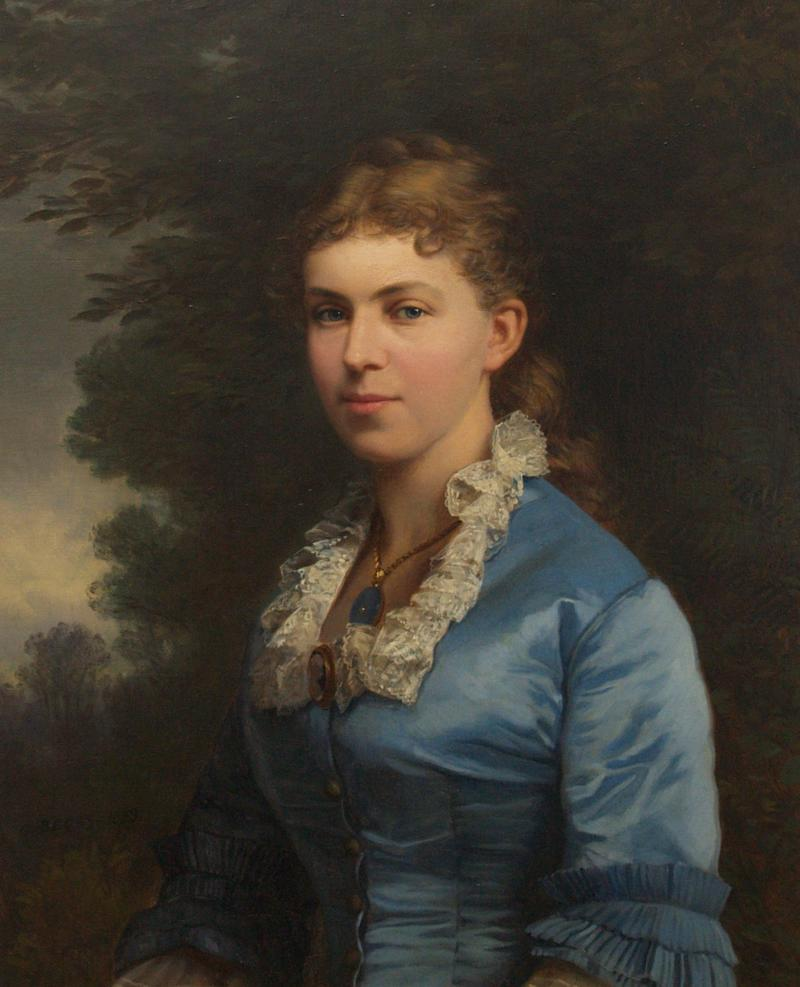
Portrait of Elisabeth Heegewaldt, 1883

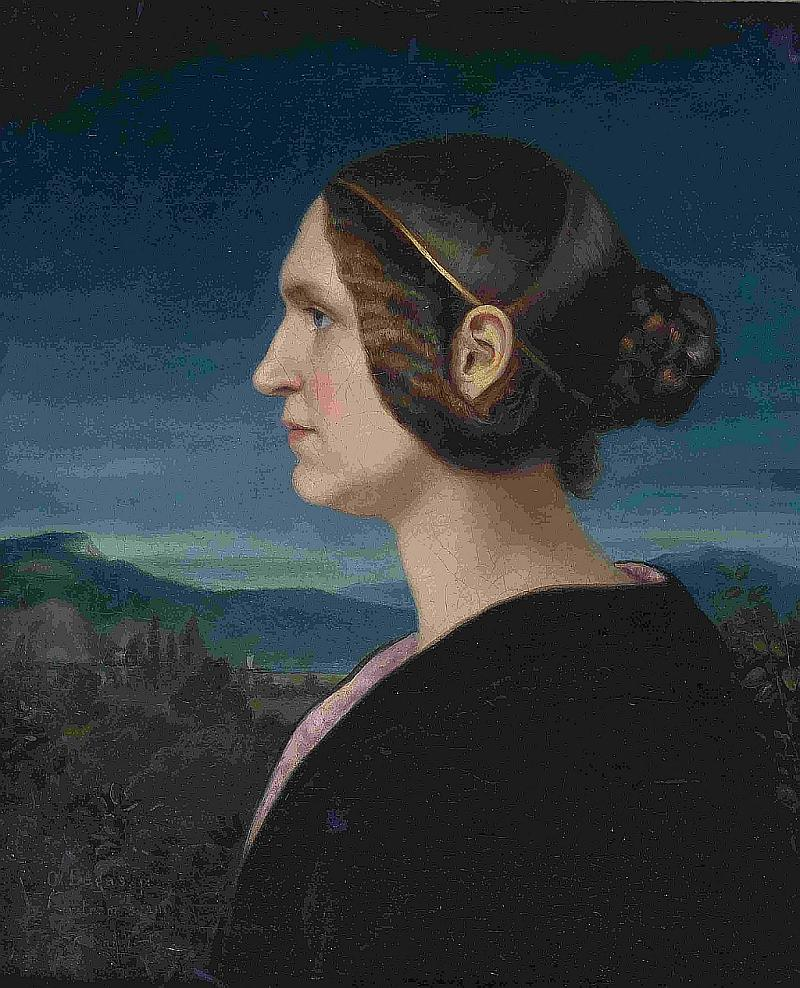
Wilhelmine Begas, 1842

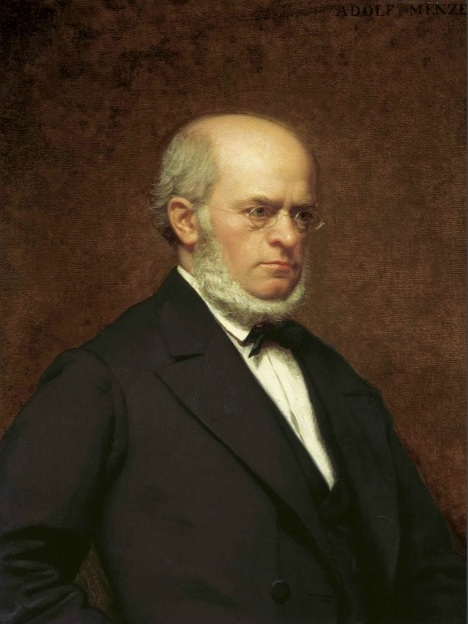
Portrait of the painter Adolph von Menzel, 1875

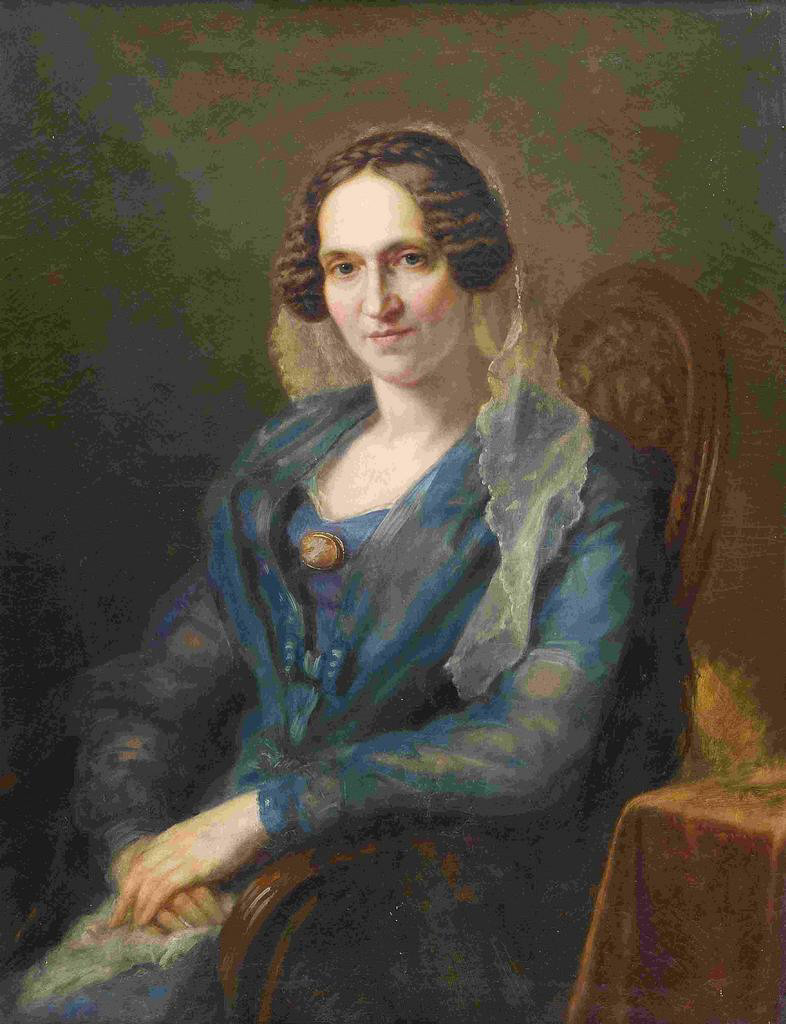
Marie Begas, 1883
