= Hermann von Wedderkop =

German writer

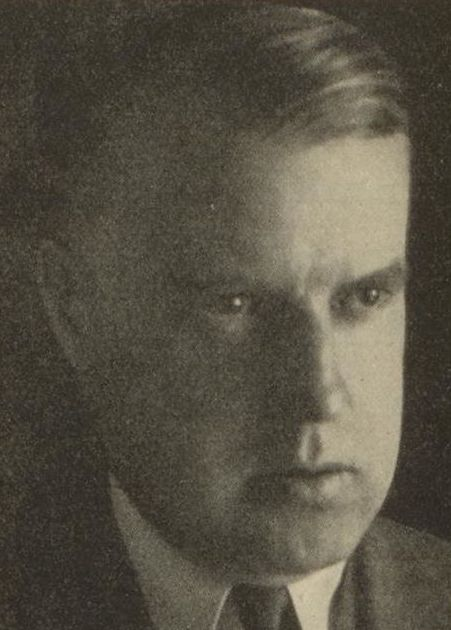
Hermann von Wedderkop

Hermann von Wedderkop (1875–1956), also known as Weddo, was a German writer, translator and editor of the art magazine Der Querschnitt.

== Career ==
He was born into the von Wedderkop family, which belonged to the German nobility. His father, Magnus von Wedderkop, was a judge and chamberlain in the Grand Duchy of Oldenburg. His mother was Elisabeth Post, a great-granddaughter of the mayor of Bremen Liborius Diederich Post. In honour of her grandfather Albert Hermann von Post, he also used the pseudonym ‘Hermann Albert Post’, which was registered by the Reichsschrifttumskammer, a subdivision of the Reich Chamber of Culture. Von Wedderkop played the piano from the age of four.

At the age of 19, Hermann von Wedderkop graduated from the Grand Ducal Grammar School in Eutin. On 1 April 1895, he joined the ‘Grand Duke of Saxony’ (5th Thuringian) Infantry Regiment No. 94 in Weimar as an avantageur. He became a lieutenant there, but had to resign in 1899 due to a heart condition. He went on to study law at the Ludwig-Maximilians-Universität München, the Kiel University and the Friedrich Wilhelm University of Berlin, where his teachers included Franz von Liszt and Heinrich Dernburg, among others.

In addition to law, he also studied art history and archaeology. On 6 September 1912, he entered the civil service as a trainee lawyer and worked at the district courts in Altona and Berlin. He then headed the district court in Mölln, Schleswig-Holstein, and later became a government assessor in Cologne.

In 1907, he met the art dealer Alfred Flechtheim in Paris, who gave him his first artistic impulses and later recruited him for his gallery magazine Der Querschnitt. Between September 1909 to July 1910, he worked as a trainee at the private bank Alfred Gans et Cie in Paris. On 1 September 1911, Wedderkop was appointed deputy chairman of the income tax assessment commission in Cologne and retired from the judiciary. In 1912, he wrote an exhibition guide for the Sonderbund in Cologne. By 1 July 1913, he was appointed acting chairman of the commission, and from 1 August 1914 he was chairman of the commission.

During World War I, Wedderkop became an orderly officer to the district governor of Brussels and, from 2 September 1915, a civil commissioner of the German occupation administration to the imperial district governor in Brussels. There, at La Hulpe, he met the writer Carl Sternheim and Gottfried Benn, who was ‘experimenting’ with cocaine as a hospital doctor at the time and thus incurred the displeasure of the administrative officer Wedderkop. Benn later accused him of having an equally disavowing affair with the 20 years younger and later decidedly ‘anti-German’ young actress Yvonne George. From 3 May 1917, Wedderkop became a government councillor in Cologne. From 1 October 1919, he was head of the state tax office in Jülich. He retired at his own request on 1 July 1921 to devote himself to his literary work.

From 1914 to 1920, Wedderkop wrote for the art magazine Kunst und Künstler and from 1920 to 1922 for Der Cicerone and Feuer. Monatsschrift für Kunst und künstlerische Kultur. In the same year, he published the book ‘Deutsche Graphik des Westens’, in which he himself wrote texts on Otto von Wätjen and Rudolf Großmann. In the early 1920s, Wedderkop was a member of the advisory board of the artists' association Young Rhineland. In the series Junge Kunst, he published the volumes on Paul Klee (1920), which was also the first monograph on Klee, and Marie Laurencin (1921). In the same year, he contributed to Der Querschnitt, which evolved from the gallery news publication Galerienachrichten by Flechtheim. As editor, Wedderkop succeeded in making Der Querschnitt into the leading German Zeitgeist magazine of the 1920s: open to the artistic avant-garde, such as Pablo Picasso, Marc Chagall and Fernand Léger, and alongside to the heroes of boxing, ironically elitist and artistic photographs of male and female nudes. Wedderkop was one of the authors of Rudolf Großmann's book Fünfzig Köpfe der Zeit, published in 1926. He also wrote for Der Piperbote für Kunst und Literatur, published by Piper Verlag.

In Ernest Hemingway's posthumous memoirs "A Moveable Feast", Wedderkop is mentioned as a buyer of his work and described as "awfully nice". According to him, Wedderkop, like the American writer, was anti-Semitic. He told his friend William B. "Bill" Smith that Wedderkop "hated Kikes more than they did". Flechtheim was Jewish. Thea Sternheim's diaries also contain anti-Semitic stereotypes from Wedderkop, who accused Flechtheim of capitalist corruption and moral depravity, drawing a direct parallel with the Dreyfus affair. Wedderkop's removal as chief editor in 1929 by the Ullstein Verlag, and from his editor's post there in May 1931, is said to have had something to do with his publicistic enthusiasm for Benito Mussolini, according to Wilmont Haacke. Wedderkop visited Mussolini on May 5 and October 10, 1930, and on May 28, 1935. After his first visit, he dedicated the portrait Mussolini wie ich ihn sehe (english: Mussolini as I see him) to Mussolini in Querschnitt, in which he saw fascism as a uniquely Italian and strictly national affair. He also dedicated a section to Mussolini in Das Buch von Rom. Wedderkop joined the Nazi Party on 1 May 1933 (membership number 2,592,748). He spent most of the period of Nazi Germany in Italy. During the 1936 Summer Olympics, he wrote the book Das unbekannte Berlin (english: The unknown Berlin).

Following the Munich Degenerate Art exhibition, the Reichsschrifttumskammer placed his positive depictions of contemporary art (e.g. “Deutsche Graphik des Westens” in 1938) on the list of ‘harmful and undesirable literature’ and his book on Paul Klee in the Silesian Museum of Fine Arts in Breslau was confiscated and destroyed. The Book of Paris’ (Das Buch von Paris) was also placed on the list of “harmful and undesirable literature” 10 years after its publication. In the justification signed by Joseph Goebbels on 7 June 1939, various pro-Jewish passages and a positive description of ‘gay and lesbian bars’ were cited, which made the travel guide completely unsuitable for the German generation. Wedderkop was monitored by the Gestapo. On 15 February 1939, he was visited by a Gestapo officer and questioned about the newspapers he wrote for. Von Wedderkop suspected that his text ‘Some Thoughts on Humour’ (Einige Gedanken über Humor) in the Kölnische Zeitung could have been the reason for this and that there was a connection to the appearance of "Die drei Rulands" in January 1939 when ‘Die drei Stadtbauarchitekten’ performed at the "Kabarett der Komiker" and were subsequently expelled from the Reich Chamber of Culture by Goebbels, which was de facto equivalent to a lifelong professional ban. Wedderkop explained that he had already written this text before their appearance.

Wedderkop turned to translations after 1938 of non-fiction bestsellers on ‘self-management’ by motivational trainer and authors Dale Carnegie and Walter B. Pitkin, which were initially published anonymously and Wedderkop later co-authored the German editions of Carnegie. When journalist and writer Ben Witter told him in the 1940s that Der Querschnitt was now being collected by the younger generation, which was not at all without danger, Wedderkop, who was on his way to Genoa, replied, ‘and I want to go to Berlin, but that's even more dangerous’. After the end of the war, he translated the literary travel memoirs Et in Arcadia ego of the Italian art critic Emilio Cecchi into German. Wedderkop celebrated his 80th birthday in 1955 back in Germany, in Hamburg.

== Alternatives ==
Wedderkop rejected the "old literature" by Gerhart Hauptmann and Thomas Mann, pressing instead for the social novel. In 1927, he published a corresponding autobiographically colored novel with Adieu Berlin. The book, set in the North Sea resort of Kampen, did not receive much attention.

More success came with his alternative travel books for Cologne, Düsseldorf, and Bonn (1928), Paris (1929), London and Rome (1930) and Oberitalien (1931), published by Piper Verlag in the series Was nicht im ″Baedeker″ steht.

== Works ==
- Der Rhein von den Alpen bis zum Meere (1931)
- Sizilien, schicksal einer insel (1940)
- Die falsche Note; ein Musikroman (1940)
