= Magnus von Wedderkop =

German nobleman and royal German lieutenant

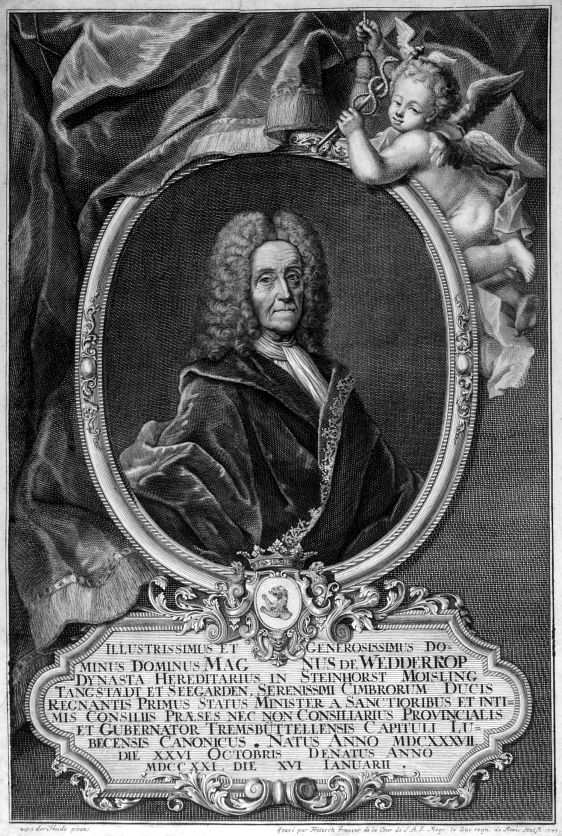
Magnus von Wedderkop.

Magnus Freiherr von Wedderkop (1637–1721), was a German nobleman and a royal German lieutenant.

== Biography ==
There are various theories about the origins and aristocratic history of the noble Wedderkop family. Magnus von Wedderkop was born in Husum, Germany, as the son of Henning von Wedderkop, who married Anna Truwelstochter Andresen in 1614. According to the diploma of nobility issued by Emperor Leopold I. the family came from the Duchy of Brabant and Gelderland, where they were 'good noblemen'. Joachim von Wedderkop, a lieutenant colonel in the army of King Philip II of Spain, had left his homeland because of his faith and moved to Franconia. Joachim's grandson and father of Magnus von Wedderkop, Henning, was a baron in Braunschweig, and served as a royal lieutenant in the cavalry under Wallenstein and came to Husum during the turmoil of the Thirty Years' War. He settled there and traded as a merchant and coppersmith 'in copper and other things'. Anna was a daughter of the merchant Truwel Andresen, a citizen of Jutland.

According to the Genealogisches Handbuch des Adels (englisch: Genealogical Handbook of the Nobility), the noble family originated in Lower Saxony. It begins its lineage with the farmer Magnus Wedderkop from Barum, a borough of Salzgitter. His son Henning Wedderkop was a coppersmith and merchant in Husum and is recorded as the father of Magnus von Wedderkop. According to the historian Olaus Heinrich Moller, Magnus Wedderkop, the grandfather of Magnus von Wedderkop, came from Franconia. Similar to the diploma of nobility, his father, Joachim Wedderkop, was a lieutenant colonel in the Spanish army in the Netherlands during the Eighty Years' War and came from the Duchy of Guelders. He became a Protestant and moved to Franconia. According to Moller, Joachim Wedderkop married the noblewoman Sophia von der Kere.

His younger brothers were Thomas Wedderkop, an advocate in Husum, Gabriel Wedderkop, pastor primarius and provost in Kiel, and Henning Wedderkop, district court notary in Schleswig.

Wedderkop attended the Husum Grammar School and the Katharineum Latin school. He earned his living by giving music lessons. He studied philosophy and law at the University of Helmstedt and University of Jena. In Jena, he was influenced by Erhard Weigel in philosophy and mathematics and by Georg Adam Struve in law. From 1661, he worked as a tutor for the patrician Brömbsen family of Lübeck and accompanied two sons of Gotthard Broemse to the Heidelberg University and then on the then common Grand Tour to Italy and France.

In 1664, he became a lecturer in constitutional and feudal law at the Heidelberg University, where he was appointed professor there by the Prince-Elector Charles I Louis. In 1669, he was appointed by Christian Albert, Duke of Holstein-Gottorp to succeed Heinrich Michaelis as professor of Code of Justinian at the law faculty of the newly founded Christian Albert Kiel University, which he accepted. He was vice-rector of the university in 1672. Wedderkop became syndic of the Lübeck cathedral chapter and counsellor to the prince-bishop of Lübeck. In 1675, he acquired the Seegard estate on Pellworm. A year later, in March 1676, he was appointed by the duke to the Gottorf Castle in Schleswig as court and chancery counsellor to the bishop of Lübeck, August Friedrich of Schleswig-Holstein-Gottorf.

Wedderkop became ducal land and chamber counsellor in 1682. As a politician, he was able to preserve the independence of the Duchy of Gottorf, which was threatened by its powerful neighbour, the Danish Realm, and to win imperial favour for this cause in the course of the Treaties of Nijmegen. One of his successes was the Treaty of Altona in 1689, by which Duke Christian Albert regained his lands from Denmark. In 1691, Wedderkop bought Steinhorst, Schleswig-Holstein from Christian Albert.

On 16 April 1683, he married Magaretha Elisabeth Pincier (1661-1731), the daughter of the Danish court councillor Ludwig Pincier, who had been ennobled by Charles XI of Sweden. On his marriage he also became a canon in Lübeck. Charles XII of Sweden, appointed him to the Council of State, in 1693 and on 23 November 1693 he was naturalised as "v. Wedderkop" and introduced into the Swedish nobility under number 1281. A year later, after the death of Christian Albert, Wedderkop became President of the Privy Council under Frederick IV, Duke of Holstein-Gottorp. His deputy was his brother-in-law, Johann Ludwig von Pincier. On 23 February 1695, Frederick IV gave him the postmaster general's office for life and the right of inheritance to his male descendants, who were also to receive it for life. In 1699, when Magnus was Holstein Gottorp's minister in Kiel, he bought the fief of Tangstedt, which included the villages of Wilstede, Duvenstede, Mellingsted and Lemsahl. He renovated the manor house and turned Tangstedt into a valuable estate that would remain in his family for 120 years. Of the seven children born to the couple, four died in infancy. Their daughter Anne Wedderkop married Sir Cyril Wyche, 1st Baronet, the British envoy to Hamburg and to the Lower Saxony Imperial Circle, in 1714. Anne received the property of Tangstedt as a dowry. Anne's daughter Frederike married Magnus von Holmer and inherited Tangstedt in 1756. The two sons Gottfried von Wedderkop and Friedrich Christian von Wedderkop married the two daughters of Johann Ludwig von Pincier in a double wedding on 3 January 1716. In 1702, Wedderkop acquired Moisling, which later became a district of Lübeck.

Politically, Wedderkop tried to maintain the stable and friendly relationship with Denmark that had been established by the Peace of Travendal, but this attitude increasingly brought him into conflict with his rising opponent, Georg Heinrich von Görtz, and his pronounced sense of power, to which he eventually fell victim. After the death of Duke Frederick IV in 1702, the latter had found a better relationship with the regent of the duchy, Christian August of Holstein-Gottorp, Prince of Eutin, who led a dissolute life, but at the same time managed the affairs of state for Charles Frederick, Duke of Holstein-Gottorp, who was only two years old. Wedderkop was given a temporary boost by an investigation into the duchy's finances initiated from Stockholm, which revealed the extravagance of the administrator and the plundering of the country by Georg Heinrich von Görtz.

In 1706, Wedderkop, who was considered a promoter of pietism, became a visitor of Kiel University together with the superintendent general Heinrich Muhlius. In 1707, they jointly issued the regulations for taking up studies, which were characterised by a pietistic spirit. In his free time, he pursued his love of music with his friends Johann Sebastian Bach and Georg Friedrich Händel.

With the death in 1708 of Hedvig Sophia of Sweden, the widow of Duke Frederick IV, who had died at the Battle of Kliszów in 1702, Wedderkop felt increasingly in need of protection and retired to his palais at Neuer Wall in Hamburg for safety. On 19 December 1709, however, Wedderkop was lured to a meeting of the Privy Council at Gottorf Castle, where the 72-year-old was warmly received, but was arrested that night after dinner with the administrator and taken to Tönning Fortress.
