= Der Querschnitt =

German art magazine

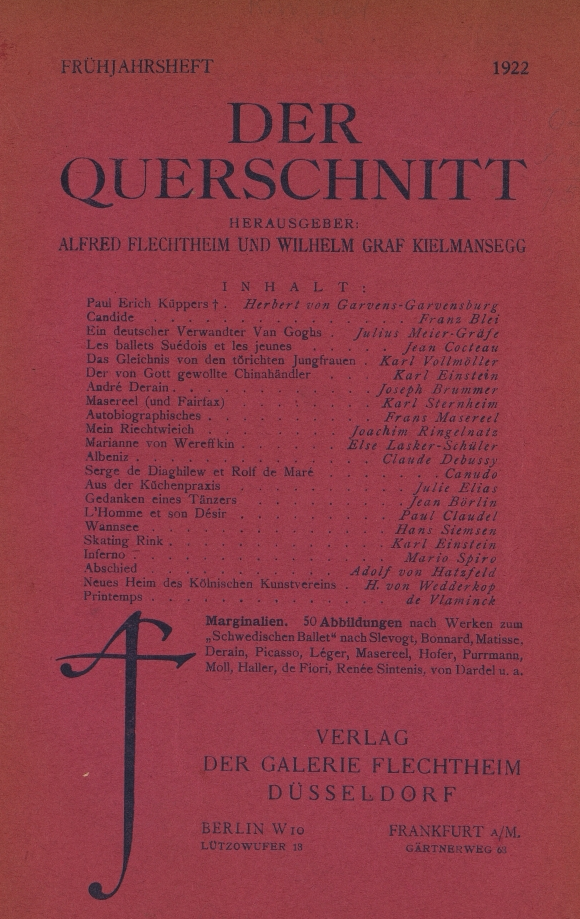
Front page of the issue in Spring 1922

Der Querschnitt (lit. ' the cross section') was an art magazine published by German art dealer Alfred Flechtheim between 1921 and 1936. The magazine was based in Berlin.

According to Erika Esau, the magazine "represented the politically detached aspirations of the aesthetically attuned of the Western world. Lightheartedly snobbish, the magazine's inclusions of works by anyone who was anybody in the Weimar period and its unorthodox graphic and literary style qualifies it as an avant-garde publication."

Der Querschnitt was seen as a German counterpart of the American magazine The Dial by some. In 1924, Ernest Hemingway published his poem "The Soul of Spain With McAlmon and Bird the Publishers" in Der Querschnitt where he directly attacked The Dial.

Hermann von Wedderkop served as an editor of the publication. Its last editor was Edmund Franz von Gordon.

== 1945-1947 Der Querschnitt ==
An unrelated newspaper of the same name was circulated to 3,000 German prisoners of war in Opelika, Alaska from 1945 to 1947. It presented left-leaning, pro-Democracy viewpoints.

== Bibliography ==
- Erika Esau, ″The magazine of enduring value: Der Querschnitt (1921-1936) and the World of illustrated magazines″, in The Oxford Critical and Cultural History of Modernist Magazines, vol. III, 2013.
- Malcolm Gee, ″Defining the modern art collector in the Weimar years″, in: Geschmacksgeschichte(n): öffentliches und privates Kunstsammeln in Deutschland, 1871- 1933, eds. U. Wolff-Thomsen, and S. Kuhrau, Kiel, Verlag Ludwig, 2011, 115–130.
- Malcolm Gee, ″The 'cultured city': the art press in Berlin and Paris in the early twentieth century″, in Printed Matters: Printing, Publishing and Urban Culture in Europe in the modern period, eds. M. Gee and T. Kirk, Ashgate, 2002, 150–173.
- Malcolm Gee, ‘The Berlin Art World, 1918-1933’ in: Malcolm Gee, Tim Kirk and Jill Steward (eds), The City in central Europe : culture and society from 1800 to the present, Ashgate, 1999.
