= Walter Bondy =

German painter

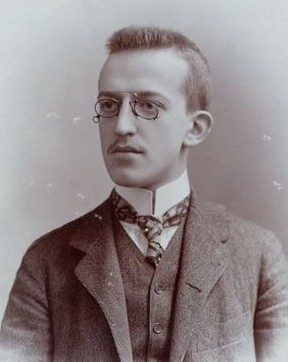
Walter Bondy (date unknown)

Walter Bondy (28 December 1880 – 17 September 1940) was a German painter, art dealer, and critic, associated with the Berlin Secession.

== Life and work ==
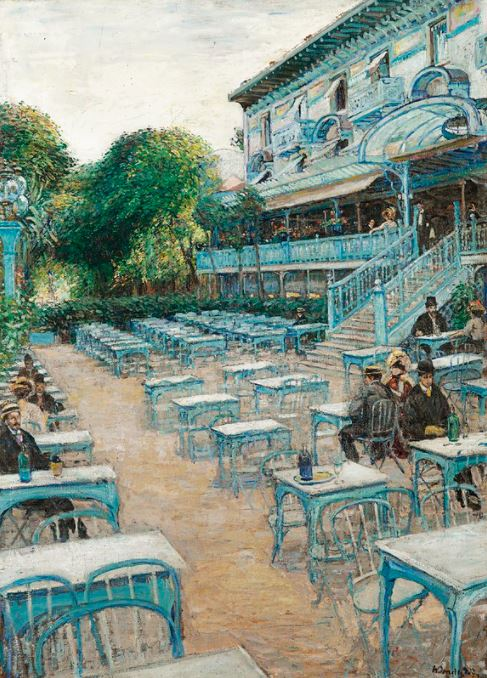
The Blue Pavilion in Saint-Cloud

He was born in Prague as the eldest son of five children born to Otto Bondy, a Jewish industrialist and art collector, and his wife, Julie née Cassirer (1860–1914), the daughter of Marcus Cassirer, a prominent cloth manufacturer. His sister, Antoinelle (1883–1961), would marry the philosopher, Ernst Cassirer. After he was born, his family moved to Vienna, where he grew up. In 1882, his father established a cable factory in Penzing.

In 1900, he left home to study painting at the Academy of Arts, Berlin. He lived in Munich in 1902, then in Paris from 1903 to 1914. There, he became part of a group of artists who gathered at Le Dôme Café. After 1908, he spent his summers at Meulan-en-Yvelines. He began his art dealing career there, when he purchased two paintings by Vincent van Gogh from a local pub owner, and sold them not long after. In 1911 and 1913, he exhibited his own works at a gallery in Berlin, owned by his cousin, Paul Cassirer.

In 1912, his daughter, Rachel Andrée, was born. Two years later, at the beginning of World War I, he married her mother, Cecile Houdy, and they moved to Berlin. After the war, he had some contact with the art trade; working for his cousin, Erich Cassirer (1881–1963), an expert on Chinese and Egyptian art, who owned an antique shop. He became an expert in Chinese woodblock prints and porcelain. He also wrote reviews for the magazine Kunst und Künstler, published by another one of his cousins, Bruno Cassirer. During these years, he divided his time between Berlin and Paris.

In 1927, he started his own magazine, Die Kunstauktion (Art Auction), which later became the Weltkunst, for which he served as editor until 1929. He also held an auction of his Asian collection in 1927, conducted by the firm of Cassirer und Helbich, in Berlin. The following year, he auctioned off more works from non-European sources, at the Hôtel Drouot in Paris. From 1929 to 1936, he was on the supervisory board of his recently deceased father's company, in Vienna, then known as "Kabelfabrik und Drahtindustrie AG" (KDAG).

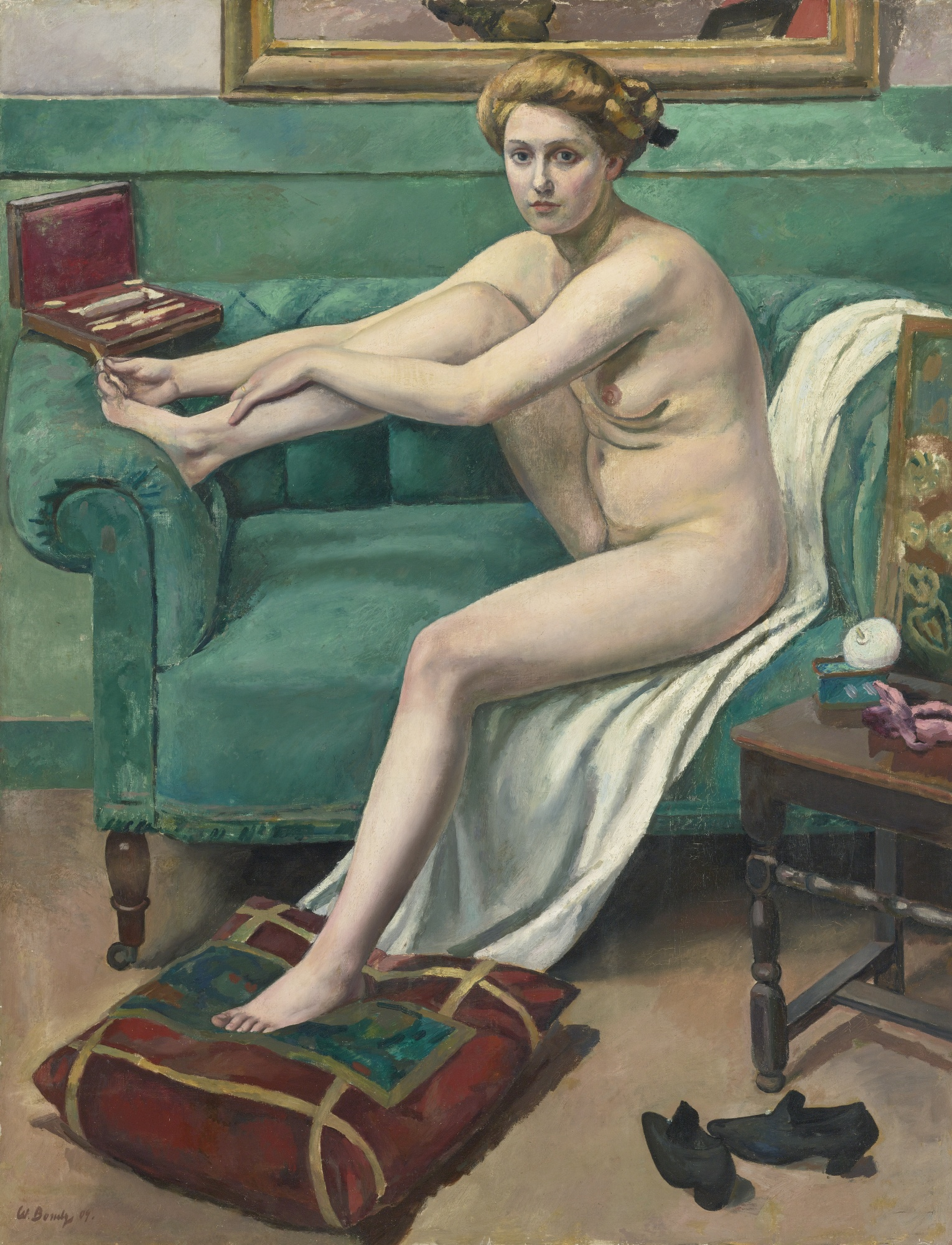
The Pedicure

The growth of anti-Semitism in Germany caused him to move his official residence to Sanary-sur-Mer, in the south of France, in 1931. His wife, Cecile, had died by then. In 1932, he met Camille Bertron, who was thirty years his junior. Together, they opened a photography studio, where they made portraits of the many German and Austrian emigrants who were in the area from 1933 to 1939. Some of these photographs have been preserved at the local library.

After 1934, he lived there permanently. In 1937, he and Camille were married. During the Battle of France, the local supply of insulin was affected and Bondy, who had been diabetic since he was a young man, was unable to have regular injections. He became ill and died in 1940, aged fifty-nine, in Toulon. Many of his paintings, which had been stored at the cable factory in Vienna, were lost during the Nazi regime.
