= Julius Meier-Graefe =

German art critic and novelist

Meier-Graefe, Julius
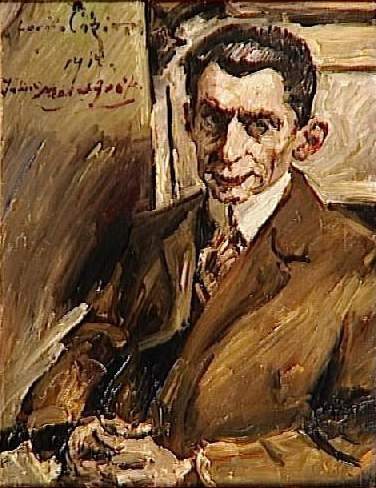
- Julius Meier-Graefe in a portrait by Lovis Corinth
- Born: Julius Meier, 10 June 1867; Resicabánya (Resicza, Reschicza, German: Reschitz, Reschitza, Romanian: Reșița), Resicabánya Dist., Krassó-Szörény Co, Bánság, Royal Hungary, Imperial and Royal Austria (now Romania)
- Died: 5 June 1935 (aged 67); Vevey, VD, Switzerland
- Occupations: Art critic, novelist

Julius Meier-Graefe (10 June 1867 – 5 June 1935) was a German art critic and novelist.

His writings on Impressionism, Post-Impressionism as well as on the art of earlier and more recent generations, with his most important contributions translated into French, Russian, and English are considered to have been instrumental for the understanding and the lasting success of these artistic movements.

== Biography ==
Meier-Graefe was born in Reschitz, Banat, Hungary, then part of the Austrian Empire. He was the grandson of Moritz Hermann Eduard Meier (Hebrew: מוריץ הרמן אדוארד מאייר), and son of Eduard (August) Meier, a government civil engineer, and Marie Theresie (Marie-Thérèse) Meier née Graefe (1835, Halle/Saale–1867, Resicabánya). The family, including his brother Max (Emil) Meier, moved to a small town near Düsseldorf, Germany. He chose the hyphenated surname Meier-Graefe to honour his mother who died giving birth to him.

He studied engineering in Munich in 1888 and married Clotilde Vitzthum von Eckstädt (who was related to the art historian Georg Vitzthum von Eckstädt). He moved to Berlin, where, in 1890, he started studying history in general and art history in particular. He began his literary career as a fiction writer with two novellas, Ein Abend bei Laura (1890) and Nach Norden (1893). His first work of art criticism, regarding Edvard Munch, was published in 1894. In 1895, he was among the founders of the arts and literary periodical Pan, but he left the magazine after a year. In 1897, he founded the Jugendstil (Art Nouveau) magazine Dekorative Kunst and soon thereafter opened La Maison Moderne in Paris, a gallery that showcased Art Nouveau works. The gallery closed in 1903.

The centennial exhibition of German art in the National Gallery in Berlin in 1906 featured Meier-Graefe's presentation of previously little-known works which first introduced the art of Caspar David Friedrich to a wider audience. Similarly, his 1910 book, Spanische Reise ("Spanish Journey"), led to the "rediscovery" of El Greco and the recognition of the artist as a forerunner to the Expressionists.

Relocating to Paris, Meier-Graefe turned his attention to 19th century French painting; his 3-volume history of modern art (1904 and 1914–24) canonized the importance of French Impressionism. He wrote important biographies of many artists, including Paul Cézanne and Vincent van Gogh.

When World War I broke out, he volunteered in the Red Cross. He was sent to the Eastern front and was captured and interned in a Russian POW camp in early 1915. Upon his return to Germany later that year, he divorced his first wife and married his second wife, Helene Lienhardt. The couple lived in Dresden but travelled often and considered France, especially Paris, a second home.

Meier-Graefe's third marriage was to Anna Marie Epstein (1905 - 1994), an illustrator and painter about 38 years his junior. A wealthy heiress, she was the only child of a Jewish couple, Else Kohn (22 March 1880 - ?) and Walter Epstein (11 May 1874 - 3 February 1918); her maternal grandparents were Adolf Kohn, a prominent German-Jewish banker, and Anna Michaelis.

In 1930, Meier-Graefe and Epstein rented an estate called La Banette in Saint-Cyr-sur-Mer. They stayed there to escape the rise of the Nazi movement in Germany, where he was under attack for his promotion of what the National Socialists called "Degenerate Art." Meier-Graefe and Epstein encouraged and helped the landscape painter Walter Bondy and the writer René Schickele to relocate to the area as well. Their efforts led to the formation of a large German-Jewish refugee arts-colony in neighboring Sanary-sur-Mer, whose members included Thomas Mann, Lion Feuchtwanger, and Ludwig Marcuse.

Meier-Graefe died in Vevey, Switzerland at the age of 67.

== Writings ==
- Ein modernes Milieu. in Dekorative Kunst (1901)
  - English translation: A Modern Milieu. Ed. by Markus Breitschmid and Harry Francis Mallgrave. Backsburg, 2007, ISBN 978-0-9794296-0-6
- Entwicklungsgeschichte der modernen Kunst. 3 vols. Hofmann, Stuttgart 1904
  - English translation: Modern Art: being a contribution to a new system of aesthetics. 3 vols. Heinemann, London; Putnam, New York 1908
  - 2nd revised and enlarged edition, Piper, Munich 1914 - 1922
- Der Fall Böcklin und die Lehre von den Einheiten. Stuttgart 1905
- Impressionisten: Guys - Manet - Van Gogh - Pissarro - Cézanne, mit einer Einleitung über den Wert der französischen Kunst und sechzig Abbildungen. Piper, Munich ¹1907 & Leipzig ²1907
  - Three of these chapters have been reprinted separately, revised and enlarged:
    - Édouard Manet
    - Vincent van Gogh. Piper, Munich (Cover design after a drawing by Vincent van Gogh)
      - 4. - 6. Td.; 50 ill. and facsimile of a letter. Piper, Munich 1912 (published in two printings with deferring illustrations!)
      - 4th, improved edition; 50 ill. (not 40 ill., as stated on the title page!) and facsimile of a letter. Piper, Munich 1918
      - 5th, improved edition; 50 ill. and facsimile of a letter. Piper, Munich 1922
      - 6th, improved edition, 14. - 16. Td.; 54 ill. and facsimile of a letter. Piper, Munich 1929
    - Paul Cézanne. Piper, Munich (Cover designed by Franz Marc, after a painting by Paul Cézanne)
      - 5th, totally revised edition, 7. - 10. Td.; 38 ill. Piper, Munich 1923
- Auguste Renoir, mit hundert Abbildungen. Piper, Munich 1911.
  - 2nd edition 1920
- Courbet. Piper, Munich 1921
  - Re-edited 1924
- Vincent. 2 vols. 103 plates. Piper, Munich ²1922
  - Pre-release serialised in Der Neue Merkur 3 (1919/1920)& 4 (1920/1921):
    - Vincent und Theo, Der Neue Merkur 3 (1919/1920), special issue: "Werden", pp. 37–78
    - Van Gogh in Paris, Der Neue Merkur 4 (1920/1921), pp. 143–169
    - Van Gogh in Arles, Der Neue Merkur 4 (1920/1921), pp. 445–460
    - Das Gelbe Haus, Der Neue Merkur 4 (1920/1921), pp. 523–532
    - Van Gogh und Gauguin, Der Neue Merkur 4 (1920/1921), pp. 622–643
    - Fou-Roux (Der rote Narr), Der Neue Merkur 4( 1920/1921), pp. 685–696
    - Van Gogh in St. Remy, Der Neue Merkur 4 (1920/1921), pp. 769–786
    - Das Ende Van Goghs, Der Neue Merkur 4 (1920/1921), pp. 822–841
- Das Tage-Buch. Geständnisse meines Vetters. Novellen. Rowohlt, Berlin 1923
- Vincent van Gogh, der Zeichner. 52 plates. O. Wacker, Berlin 1928
- Renoir. Klinkhardt & Biermann, Leipzig 1929, with 407 illustrations and 10 plates
