= Von Wedderkop =

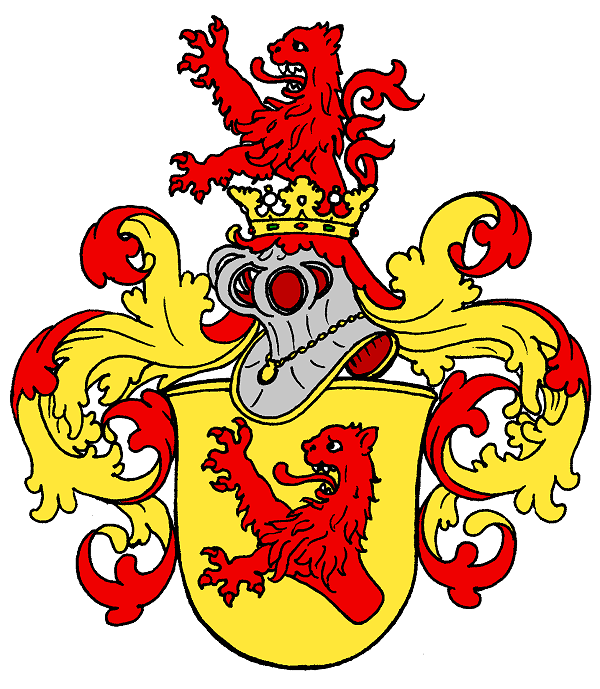
Coat of Arms of the Wedderkop family

The von Wedderkop was a German noble family originated in Lower Saxony and went extinct in 1962.

In the 17th century the von Wedderkop family received two peerages. First, on 17 June 1687, Leopold I, Holy Roman Emperor, raised Magnus Wedderkop to the German nobility and ennobled him as a knight of Schleswig-Holstein. This made the family one of the recepti, the families accepted into the knighthood unconditionally or conditionally by a special legal act, as opposed to the Equites Originarii (Latin for 'original knights'), the original noble families of Holstein and Stormarn. They were later ennobled as 'v. Wedderkop' on 23 November 1693 and admitted to the Swedish nobility and the Swedish knighthood under no. 1281. According to the Hamburger Abendblatt of 12 November 1962, Lieutenant General of the Wehrmacht Magnus von Wedderkop was the last bearer of the von Wedderkop name.

One line of the family held the title of Freiherr, while other lines remained part of the untitled nobility.

== Notable members ==
- Magnus von Wedderkop (1637–1721), German baron and royal lieutenant
- Hermann von Wedderkop (1875–1956), German author
