= Gräfe =

Gräfe is a surname, and may refer to:

- Albrecht von Graefe (ophthalmologist) (1828–1870), German oculist
- Annah Graefe, late 20th- early 21st-century German folksinger
- Eva-Maria Graefe, German mathematical physicist
- Karl Ferdinand von Gräfe (1787–1840), German surgeon
