= Adalbert Begas =

German painter (1836–1888)

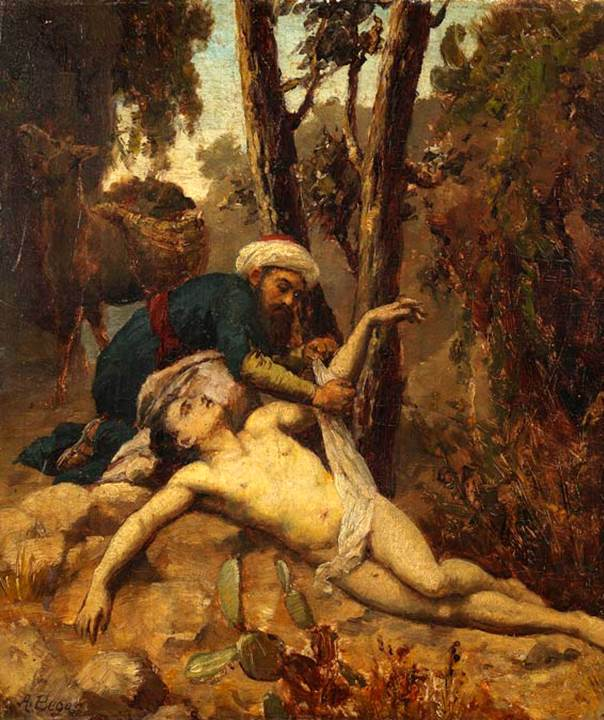
The Merciful Samaritan (date unknown)

Adalbert Franz Eugen Begas (8 March 1836 – 21 January 1888) was a German painter.

== Life ==
He was born in Berlin as the third son of painter Carl Joseph Begas. Because of his drawing skills, his father encouraged him to become an engraver and sent him to study at the Prussian Academy of Art with the copper engraver and lithographer Gustav Lüderitz. In 1849, he went to Paris to complete his studies. His encounters with the works of the old masters there led to his decision to become a painter instead.

In 1862, he followed his brother, the sculptor Reinhold Begas to the Weimar Saxon-Grand Ducal Art School, where he found work in the studios of Arnold Böcklin. He took a study trip to Italy in 1864, where he was influenced by paintings of the Madonna. On his return to Berlin, he earned his living primarily as a portrait painter, but was more enthusiastic about producing dreamy genre scenes and idealized (often allegorical) female figures.

In 1877, he married the landscape and architecture painter Luise von Parmentier. The couple made frequent visits to Italy (especially Capri and Venice), inspiring him to make his genre scenes more realistic and colorful. He died in Nervi during one of these trips of an unspecified pulmonary disorder.
