= Dekorative Kunst =

German art magazine (1897 to 1929)

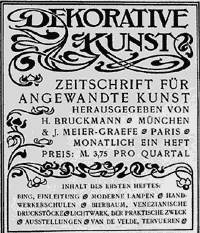
1903 magazine cover

Dekorative Kunst (meaning Decorative Art in English) was a German avant-garde art magazine published from October 1897 to 1929. The magazine promoted the Jugendstil or Art Nouveau style and was founded by Julius Meier-Graefe. The publisher of the magazine was Alexander Koch. It was based in Munich where it was published on a monthly basis. It had a sister magazine, Die Kunst, which was a fine arts magazine.

In 1929 the magazine was renamed Das schöne Heim.
