= Rudolf Großmann =

German painter

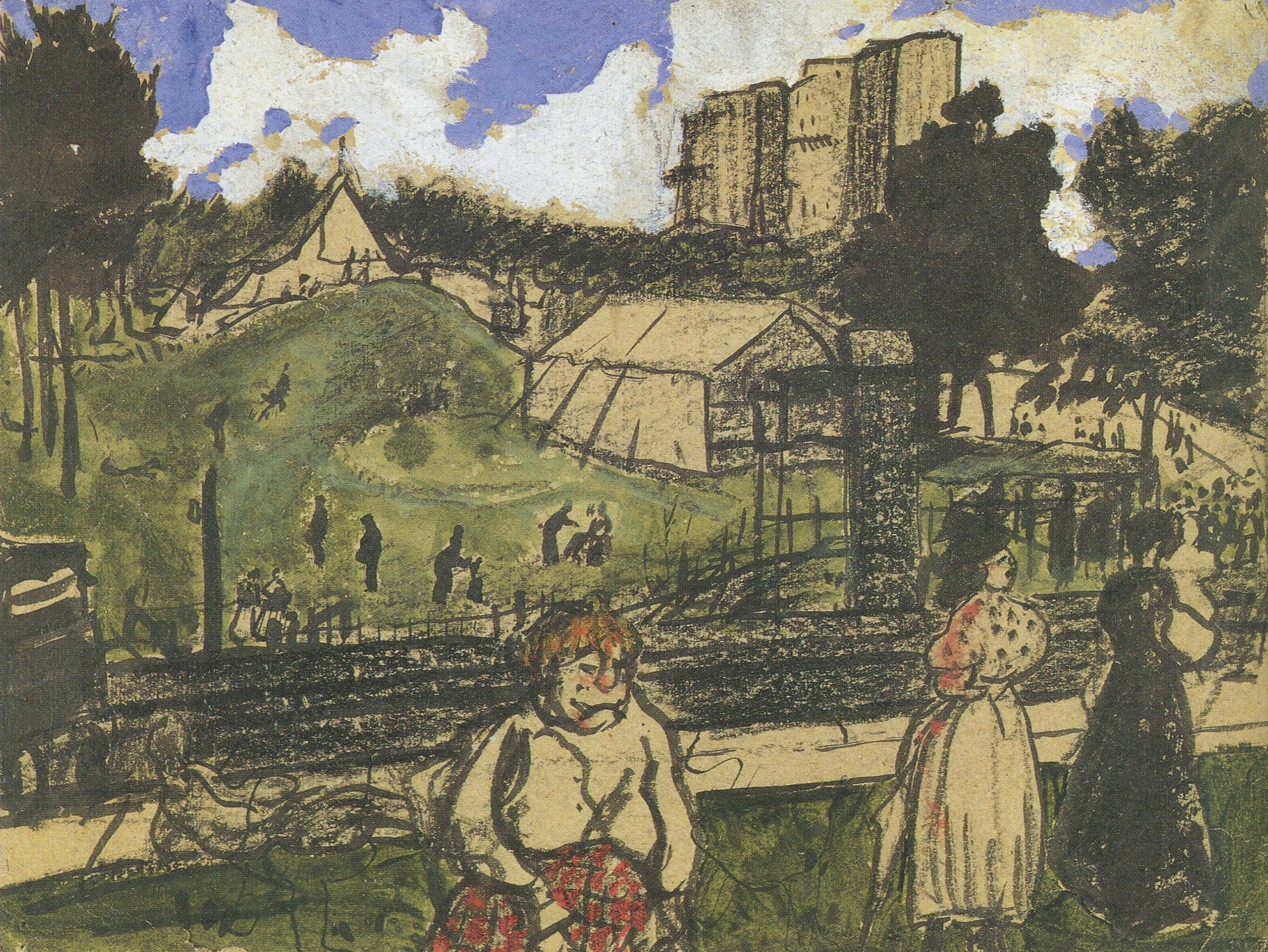
Parc des Buttes Chaumont

Rudolf Wilhelm Walther Großmann, or Grossmann (25 January 1882, Freiburg im Breisgau – 28 November 1941, Freiburg im Breisgau) was a German painter and graphic artist. He is particularly well known for his portrait drawings of famous contemporary figures.

== Biography ==
He was born into an artistic environment. His grandfather, Wilhelm Dürr, was the court painter in Baden and his mother, Marie (1852–1889), was a portrait painter. His father, Viktor, was a doctor, so he initially studied medicine and philosophy in Munich, from 1902 to 1904, then spent five years in Paris, where he was a student of Lucien Simon. While there, he devoted himself primarily to landscape painting, under the influence of Paul Cézanne.

With his friend, Jules Pascin, he travelled to Belgium and The Netherlands. Later study trips took him to Northern and Southern France, then to Vienna, Budapest and Stockholm. In 1910, he stayed briefly in Berlin, then continued his travels; this time to Engadin (near Munich), the Tegernsee and Italy, where he lived with his friend, Hans Purrmann.

Upon returning to Germany, he lived in Berlin; creating book illustrations and portraits of celebrities, many of which were featured in the satirical magazine Simplicissimus. In 1928, he became a Professor at the Royal School of Art. He was also a member of the Berlin Secession and the Deutscher Künstlerbund.

After Adolf Hitler's rise to power, in 1934, he was dismissed from his professorship and retired to his hometown. Under the National Socialist government, his works were declared to be "degenerate art" and 206 of them were confiscated. Three were put on display at the propagandistic Degenerate Art Exhibition of 1937.

== Selected works ==
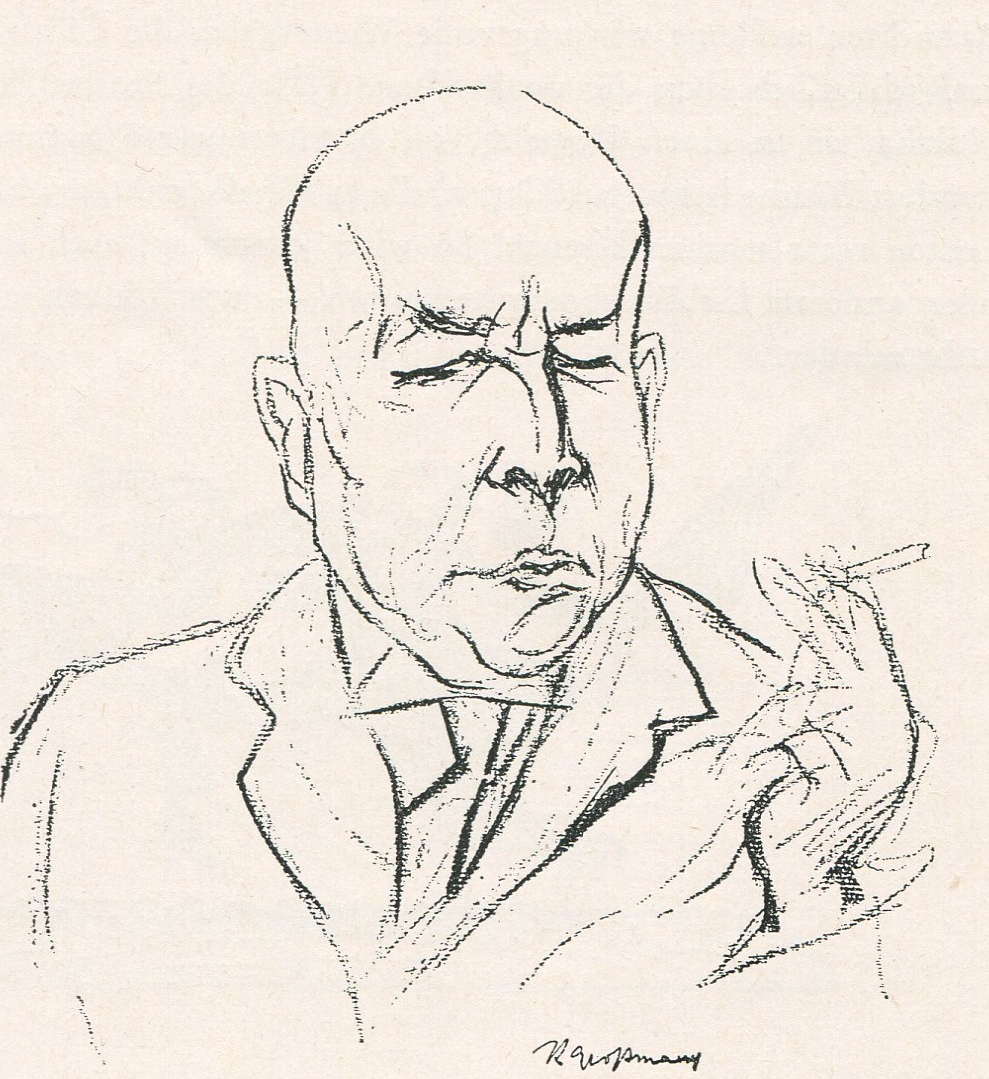
Oswald Spengler

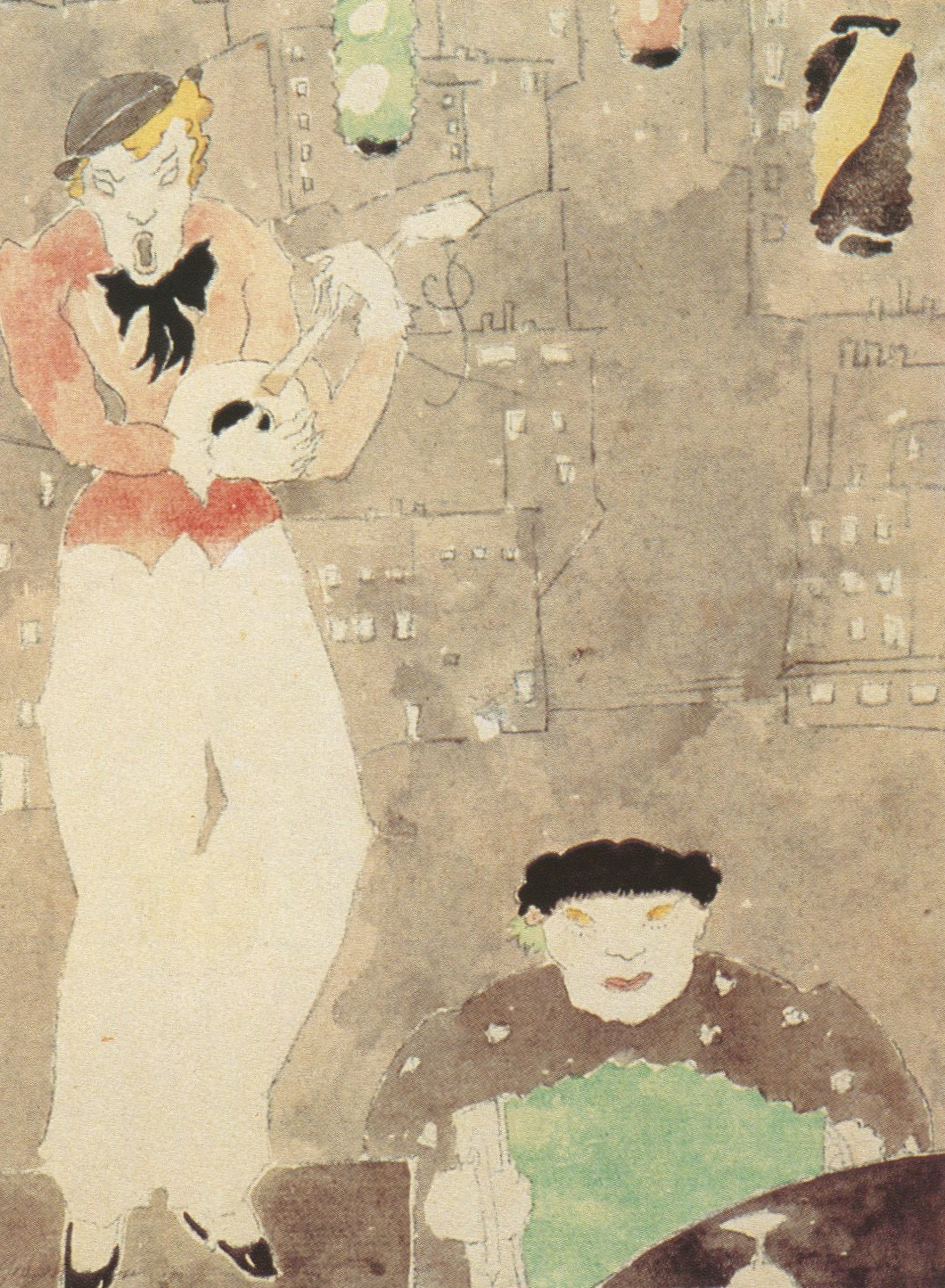
Musicians

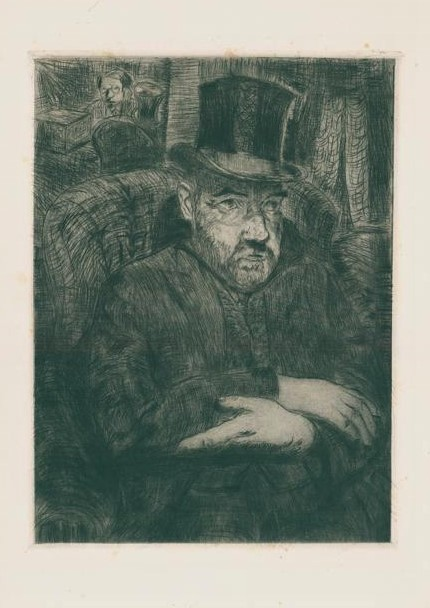
Benedetto Croce

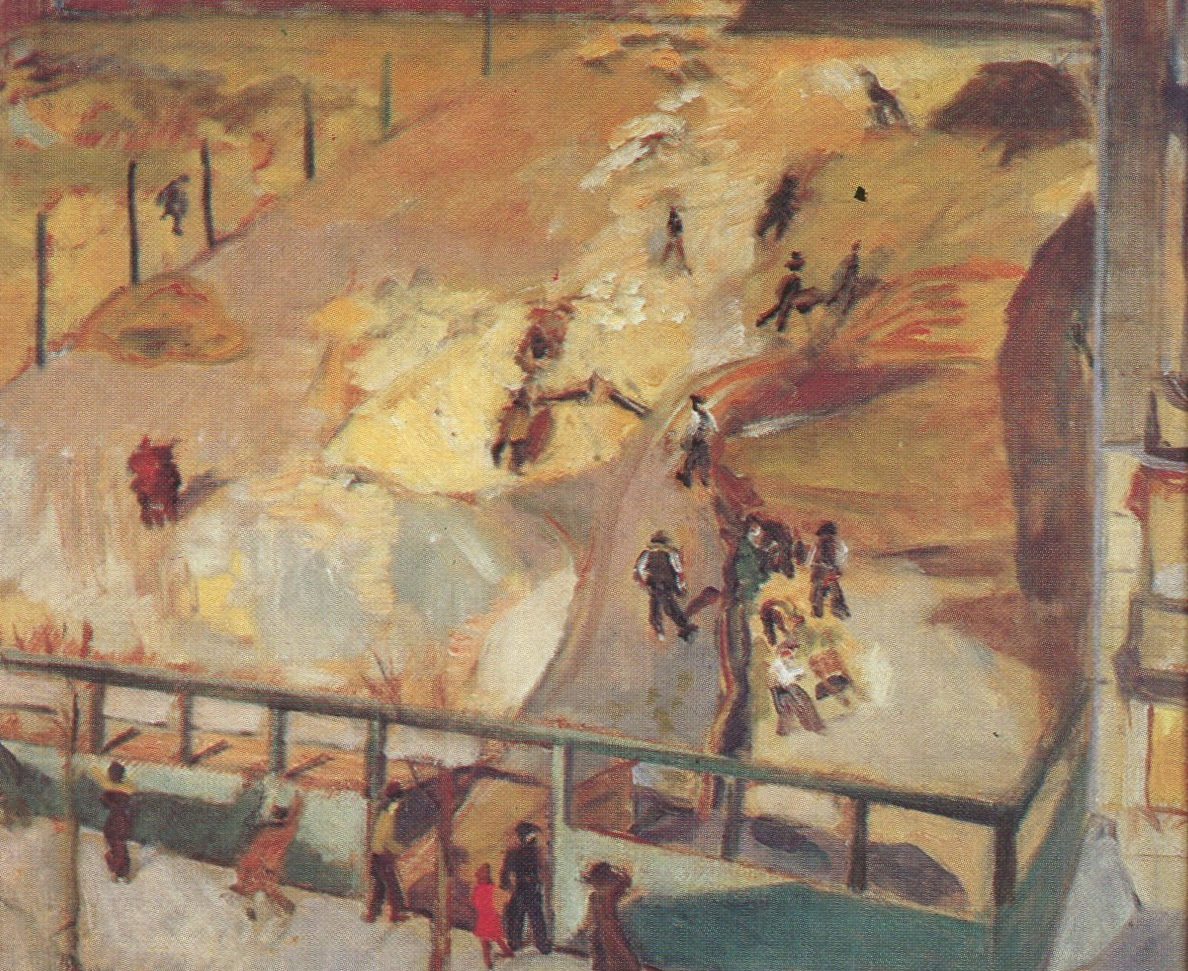
Street Construction

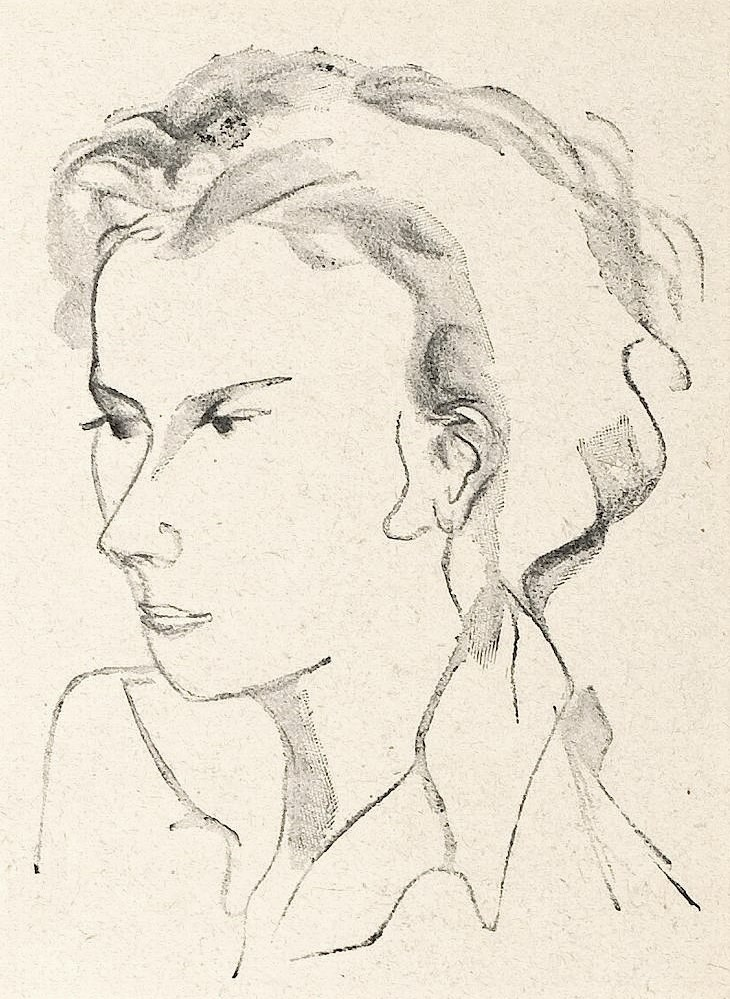
Greta Garbo
