= Bruno Cassirer =

German publisher and art dealer (1872–1941)

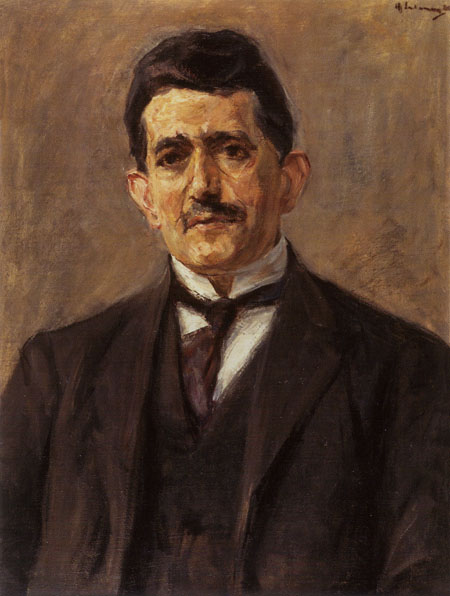
- Max Liebermann, Portrait of Bruno Cassirer, 1921
- Born: 12 December 1872; Wrocław, German Empire (now Wrocław, Poland)
- Died: 29 October 1941 (aged 68); Oxford, England
- Occupations: Publisher, Gallery Owner
- Years active: 1898–1941
- Organizations: Berlin Secession, Cassirer Publishing House
- Children: 1

Bruno Cassirer (12 December 1872 – 29 October 1941) was a publisher and gallery owner in Berlin who had a considerable influence on the cultural life of the city.

== Biography ==
He was born on 12 December 1872 in Breslau, the second child of Jewish parents, Julius and Julcher Cassirer. Julius was a partner, with two of Bruno's cousins, in a cable factory. Julius completed his final school examination in 1890 at the Leibniz-Gymnasium.

In 1898, together with his cousin Paul Cassirer, he opened a gallery and bookshop at 35 Viktoriastraße near Kemperplatz, Berlin. On 2 May 1898, the artists' association Berlin Secession was established with Paul and Bruno as secretaries. For three years, they acquainted the art and literature scenes of Berlin with the newest waves from Belgian, English, French and Russian culture.

In 1901, Bruno and Paul divided the business into separate parts, with Paul running the gallery and art dealership, whilst Bruno owned the publishing side, which relocated to 15 Derfflingerstraße. In 1902, he founded the monthly art journal Kunst und Künstler (Art and Artist), which turned out to become an influential and prestigious forum until it was closed down by the Nazis in 1933. In 1903, Christian Morgenstern joined as literary editor and the journal "Das Theater" was founded under his direction.

== Nazi era: persecution and emigration ==
When the Nazis came to power in 1933, Cassirer was persecuted because of his Jewish heritage. In 1936, Jewish printers were removed from membership of the Reich Chamber of Literature, and the last book appeared from the Cassirer publishing house. In 1938, part of the Cassirer family emigrated to Oxford, where Bruno founded a new publishing house.

He died on 20 October 1941 in Oxford, England.

After the death of Bruno Cassirer, his son-in-law Dr. George Hill (born Günther Hell), continued the publishing business until he died in 1995.

Other notable members of Bruno Cassirer's family included the philosopher Ernst Cassirer and the neurologist Richard Cassirer.

== Restitution of Nazi-looted art ==
In March 2025, two works by Max Slevogt were restituted to the heirs of Bruno Cassirer. "Portrait of Bruno Cassirer" and "Der Vater Bruno Cassirers auf dem Totenbett" were returned and then repurchased.
