= Ritchie Boys =

WWII US special military intelligence unit

The Ritchie Boys, part of the U.S. Military Intelligence Service (MIS) at the War Department, were an organization of soldiers in World War II with sizable numbers of German and Austrian recruits who were used primarily for interrogation of prisoners on the front lines and counter-intelligence in Europe. Trained at secret Camp Ritchie in Washington County, Maryland, many of the total around 22,000 men and women in service were German-speaking immigrants to the United States, often Jews, who fled Nazi persecution. After the war, many former Ritchie Boys rose to important positions in the military and in the intelligence community. In addition to interrogation and counter-intelligence, they were trained in psychological warfare to study and demoralize the enemy, and some later served as prosecutors and translators in the Nuremberg trials.

The parent organization of the Ritchie Boys, the MIS, was commanded in Washington by Brigadier General Hayes Adlai Kroner for most of the war.

== Camp Ritchie ==
The Ritchie Boys consisted of approximately 20,000 servicemen and 2,000 Women's Army Corps members, who were trained for U.S. Army Intelligence during World War II at the secret Camp Ritchie training facility. Most of the men sent to Camp Ritchie for training were assigned there because of fluency in German, French, Italian, Polish, or other languages that were needed by the US Army during the war. Members had been drafted into or volunteered to join the United States Army and, after their ability to speak an enemy language had been discovered, were sent to Camp Ritchie on secret orders. Some of the Jewish refugees who were part of this program had originally arrived in the US as children, many without their parents, and were also among the One Thousand Children.

They were trained at the Military Intelligence Training Center at Camp Ritchie in Maryland, later officially known as Fort Ritchie (it was closed in 1998 under the 1995 Base Realignment and Closure Commission). They were specially trained in methods of intelligence, counterintelligence, interrogation, investigation and psychological warfare. Nine hundred of these men also attended special training at Camp Sharpe, Pennsylvania. The Jewish refugees were qualified for these tasks because they knew the German language and understood the German mentality and behavior better than most American-born soldiers. The role of the soldiers was, therefore, to work in the front lines, at strategic corps and army levels, at interrogation, analyzing German forces and plans, and to study and demoralize the enemy. The majority of them went on to work as members of the US Counter Intelligence Corps.

During the Battle of the Bulge, two Ritchie Boys were recognized by their accents, and the German officer Curt Bruns then ordered them both to be summarily executed; he said, "The Jews have no right to live in Germany." He was captured on February 15, 1945, put on trial for the murders, and sentenced to death by firing squad. Bruns was executed on June 15, 1945, the first World War II criminal to be executed by the US Army.

== Campaigns ==
=== Europe ===
After the German declaration of war against the United States on December 11, 1941, the Ritchie Boys became an important weapon for the Allies. Many of them entered Europe on D-Day (6 June 1944). Others followed over time. Shortly after reaching land, they left their units and pursued their special tasks. They fed the Allies valuable information. General Oscar Koch (General Patton's G-2) acknowledged that the advance warning of the German Bulge offensive occurred because of information gathered by their MIS units. Moreover, the Ritchie Boys helped break German resistance by demoralizing them in both open and covert operations. They interrogated prisoners-of-war and defectors to obtain information about the Germans' force levels, troop movements, and physical and psychological states. A common interrogation tactic was to use the Germans' fear of transfer into Soviet custody. By means of targeted disinformation by newspaper announcements, flyers, radio broadcasts, and sound trucks, the German population and military were encouraged to cease their resistance to the Allied invasion.

=== Pacific ===
Camp Ritchie also trained over 500 Nisei (second-generation Japanese-Americans) for PACMIRS (Pacific Military Intelligence Research Service), a program to translate documents the U.S. Navy captured in Saipan in July 1944. Fifteen crates of documents were sent to Camp Ritchie for training purposes and were not considered to have any military intelligence. One Nisei, Kazuo Yamane, digging into a crate, retrieved what he believed to be a textbook but soon discovered it to be meeting minutes from a gathering of all of Japan's armories. The notes contained locations of the armories, the number of weapons held by Imperial Japan, and spare parts held and indicated that Japan had half as many of weapons available to it in 1944 as it had in 1943. Yamane immediately contacted his superior, who contacted the War Department, which translated the text into English. The Americans then located and destroyed the armories. Yamane called this act his "Proof of Loyalty" because he claimed that he could easily have not reported the document to his superiors. A 2017 film, Proof of Loyalty: Kazuo Yamane and the Nisei Soldiers of Hawaii, detailed his time in the service and at Ritchie.

== Postwar ==
A classified postwar report by the U.S. Army found that nearly 60 percent of the credible intelligence gathered in Europe had come from the Ritchie Boys.

After the war, many of the Ritchie Boys served as translators and interrogators such as during the Nuremberg Trials. Many of them went on to successful political, scientific, or business careers.

The first-ever reunion of the Ritchie Boys took place from 23–25 July 2011 at the Holocaust Memorial Center, in Farmington Hills, Michigan. Another reunion was held in June 2012 in Washington, D.C., and at Fort Ritchie, which had then closed.

In August 2021, the Ritchie Boys were honored in a congressional resolution.

Following the sale of Fort Ritchie in April 2021, a museum and educational center was opened on June 9, 2023 to continue commemorating the story of the Ritchie Boys in the location that they had originally trained. On April 25, 2022, Maryland State Senator Paul Corderman officially announced $400,000 of state funding for the creation of a museum at Camp Ritchie to honor the legacy of the Ritchie Boys and the history of the Army Post. Then museum director, Landon Grove, presented a number of talks and interviews, including several NPR discussions in Tulsa, Oklahoma, to spread the story of the soldiers.

The Ritchie Boys were honored by the United States Holocaust Memorial Museum with the Elie Wiesel Award, the museum's highest honor to recognize "the unique role they played serving the United States and advancing our victory over Germany". The Ritchie Boys Arno Mayer and Gideon Kantor were present to accept the award, and a keynote speech was given by Mark Milley.

On October 31, 2022, a press conference was held at Fort Ritchie and Representative David Trone announced he expected to introduce in Congress a bill to award the Ritchie Boys the Congressional Gold Medal.

== Notable Ritchie Boys ==
Anyone who attended Camp Ritchie is considered a Ritchie Boy for this list, whether or not they went on to serve in Europe:

- William Aalto
- Robert H. Abeles, chemist
- Lloyd Alexander
- Werner Angress, historian
- Joseph Anthony
- Ralph H. Baer
- Gardner Botsford
- John Robert Boker Jr.
- Victor Brombert
- Hanus Burger
- John Chafee
- Prince David Chavchavadze
- Frank Church
- William Sloane Coffin
- John E. Dolibois
- Joseph W. Eaton
- Claudius Miller Easley, Jr., son of Claudius Miller Easley
- Alexander Eckstein
- Leon Edel
- Leonard Edmondson
- Eugene Ehrlich
- Hermann Eilts
- Don Eliason
- William Emerson (journalist)
- Paul Fairbrook
- Eugene Fodor
- Tom Forkner
- Prince Gaetano of Bourbon-Parma
- Harris Gaylord Warren
- Robert F. Goheen
- Landis Gores
- Alfred de Grazia
- Adolf Grünbaum
- Hans Habe
- Fred Henderson
- Stefan Heym
- J. B. Jackson
- George Jellinek
- Philip Johnson
- Theodore N. Kaufman
- Walter Arnold Kaufmann
- Konrad Kellen
- Henry Kissinger
- John Kluge
- Ted Knap
- John Kneller
- Robert Lewis Koehl
- Robert Komer
- André Kostolany
- Ed Koterba
- Fritz G. A. Kraemer
- Melvin Kranzberg
- Georg Kreisler
- William Krimer, interpreter for four U.S. presidents
- Herman Lang
- Ralph LaPointe
- Si Lewen, painter
- Richard Pipes
- Maximilian Lerner
- Hans F. Loeser
- James Lord
- George Mandler
- Klaus Mann
- Gilberto José Marxuach
- Arno J. Mayer
- Ib Melchior
- Joseph Mugnaini
- Hugh Nibley
- Gottfried E. Noether
- John Bertram Oakes
- William R. Perl
- Laughlin Phillips
- Eric Pleskow
- Charles Poser
- Nicholas V. Riasanovsky
- Frank K. Richardson
- Maurino Richton
- Marvin Resnik, father of astronaut Judith Resnik
- Howard W. Robison
- David Rockefeller
- Robert Rodenberg, founder of the Baltimore Colts
- Toby E. Rodes
- Archibald Roosevelt Jr.
- J. D. Salinger
- Irvin C. Scarbeck
- Paul J. Scheuer
- Richard Schifter
- Rudolph Schirmer, former chairman of the board of G. Schirmer Inc.
- David Schoenbrun
- Harold Zvi Schiffrin
- Talcott Williams Seelye
- Oskar Seidlin
- Lorenzo Semple Jr.
- David Seymour
- Donald Shively
- Nicolai Shutorev
- Arnold M. Silver
- Ruffy Silverstein
- George Skibine
- Herbert Spiro
- Guy Stern
- Wilbur C. Sze
- Hans Trefousse
- Rolf Valtin
- Harry Wald
- Vernon A. Walters
- William Warfield
- John Weitz
- Edwin Wolf II
- Peter H. Wyden
- Ernst Wynder
- Jirayr Zorthian

Instructors at Camp Ritchie included Rex Applegate and professional wrestler Man Mountain Dean.

== In popular culture ==
- In 2004, the documentary movie The Ritchie Boys by Christian Bauer featured ten of the Ritchie Boys.
- Sons and Soldiers, a 2017 nonfiction book about the Ritchie Boys by Bruce Henderson, was a New York Times bestseller. The Boston Globe called it "a magnificent story...one of courage and determination, revenge and redemption, grippingly told in a fast-moving narrative". Sons and Soldiers is being developed for a feature film.
- In 2015, the book Immigrant Soldier: The Story of a Ritchie Boy by K. Lang-Slattery was published. It is a fictionalized historical account based on the experiences of her uncle, Herman Lang, a Jewish refugee from Nazi Germany who escaped to America via England, was trained at Camp Ritchie, returned to Germany as a US soldier specializing in prisoner interrogation and translation, and served under General Patton.
- On May 9, 2021, the story of the Ritchie Boys was presented in a forty-minute segment of the CBS news show 60 Minutes. Victor Brombert, 97, Paul Fairbrook, 98, and Guy Stern, 99, gave personal testimony. On January 2, 2022, an expanded one hour version called "60 Minutes Presents" was shown. The program re-aired on July 3, 2022, due to its popularity.

== See also ==
- P. O. Box 1142, codename for MIS special wing, MIS-Y, POW interrogation, at Fort Hunt, Virginia

== Bibliography ==
- Eddy, Beverley Driver (2021). Ritchie Boy Secrets: How a Force of Immigrants and Refugees Helped Win World War II. Guilford, Connecticut: Stackpole Books. ISBN 978-0811769969. OCLC 1227916710.
- Henderson, Bruce (2017). Sons and Soldiers: The Untold Story of the Jews Who Escaped the Nazis and Returned with the U.S. Army to Fight Hitler. New York: William Morrow. ISBN 978-0062419095. OCLC 1014240736. Archived from the original on 20 October 2020.
- Book review: Foy, David A. (2 October 2017). "Intelligence in Literature and Media: Reviewed: Sons and Soldiers: The Untold Story of the Jews Who Escaped the Nazis and Returned with the US Army to Fight Hitler". Studies in Intelligence. 61 (3). Center for the Study of Intelligence, CIA. Archived from the original on 6 December 2017.
- Book review: Heilbrunn, Jacob (December 2017). "Book Review: Sons and Soldiers". World War II. HistoryNet LLC.
- Lackner, Robert (2020). Camp Ritchie und seine Österreicher. Deutschsprachige Verhörsoldaten der US-Armee im Zweiten Weltkrieg, Wien: Böhlau Verlag. ISBN 978-3-205-21009-2.
