= Karl Nierendorf =

German banker

Karl Nierendorf (18 April 1889 – 25 October 1947) was a German banker and later, art dealer. He was particularly known for championing the work of contemporary Expressionists in Cologne and Berlin before the War, especially Paul Klee, Otto Dix, and Vasily Kandinsky.

== Career ==
Karl Nierendorf was born on 18 April 1889. He founded the publishing house Kairos Verlag, which produced the magazine Der Strom, and represented the work of Hans Hansen, and the drawings of Max Ernst and others.

Together with his younger brother, Josef Nierendorf (1898-1949), in 1920 they founded Nierendorf Köln Neue Kunst in Cologne. In 1921, he met Otto Dix in Dusseldorf, and in 1923, the brothers established the Galerie Nierendorf there. In 1923, Nierendorf took over J.B. Neumann's Berlin gallery, following Neumann's departure for New York City, renaming it the Galeire Neumann-Nierendorf.

In 1937, Nierendorf moved to New York City, and established the Nierendorf Gallery there, as well as a subsidiary gallery, International Art, in Hollywood. The director was Estella Kellen, born Katzenellenbogen and sister of Konrad Kellen.

In 25 October 1947, he died suddenly from a heart attack. In 1948, the Guggenheim Museum purchased his entire estate for US$72,000, including more than 150 works of art by Paul Klee alone.

== Legal disputes ==
In 2008 the heirs of Oskar Reichel requested the restitution of "Two Nudes (Lovers)" by Oskar Kokoschka which the Nierendorf Gallery had purchased from Otto Kallir in 1945 before reselling it. The Museum of Fine Arts, Boston, which ended up with the painting, filed a successful lawsuit against the Reichel heirs claiming title.

In 2017 the heirs of Kurt Grawi made a restitution claim for a painting by Franz Marc that had passed through the Nierendorf Gallery in 1939. After a contentious dispute it was restituted by the city of Dusseldorf in 2021. Also in 2017 the heirs of the Jewish businessman and collector Eugen Moritz Buchthal recovered nine works from the Kupferstichkabinett Berlin which had purchased them through the Nierendorf Gallery.

In 2023, “Die trauernde Braut” (“Mourning Bride”) by Otto Dix which passed through Nierendorf was the object of a search request from the heirs of Otto and Käte Ralf, a Jewish couple who was plundered by the Nazis.
