= Victor Brombert =

American philologist (1923–2024)

- Born: Victor Henri Bromberg; November 11, 1923; Berlin, Brandenburg, Prussia, Germany
- Died: November 26, 2024 (aged 101); Princeton, New Jersey, U.S.
- Occupation: Professor
- Spouse: Beth Archer (m. 1950)
- Children: 2

Academic background
- Education: Yale University (BA, PhD)

Academic work
- Discipline: Comparative literature
- Sub-discipline: 19th- and 20th-century literature
- Institutions: Yale University; Princeton University
- Military career
- Allegiance: United States
- Branch: United States Army
- Service years: 1943–1946
- Unit: Ritchie Boys
- Wars: World War II

Victor Henri Brombert (né Bromberg; November 11, 1923 – November 26, 2024) was an American scholar of 19th and 20th century literature. He taught at Yale University and Princeton University, becoming Princeton's Henry Putnam University Professor.

== Early life ==
Victor Bromberg was born in Berlin on November 11, 1923, into a well-to-do Russian-Jewish family that had fled Russia at the outbreak of the Russian Revolution and settled in Leipzig. When Hitler came to power in Germany, the family left for Paris, and Brombert received his secondary education at the Lycée Janson-de-Sailly. As the German army advanced on Paris in 1940, the family fled to the unoccupied zone under the control of the Vichy government and a year later, in 1941, escaped via Spain to the United States, settling in New York.

== Military career ==
In May 1943, he was drafted into the US Army. Due to his fluency in French, German, and Russian he was placed in a special unit, composed chiefly of refugees from Nazi-occupied European countries, that was trained in front-line military intelligence at Camp Ritchie, Maryland, and later featured in a 2004 documentary film "The Ritchie Boys". According to The New York Times, he changed his surname to Brombert during his military service "in response to a sense in his unit that a German name could be a liability in the event of capture".

In 1944 he took part in the Normandy landings with the 2nd Armored Division at Omaha Beach and also saw action with the 28th Infantry Division in the Battle of the Bulge.

In 2021, Brombert, then 97, was one of several surviving Ritchie Boys featured in a 60 Minutes episode on the unit.

== Academic career ==
After the war, Brombert studied at Yale University, where he received a B.A. in 1948 and a Ph.D. in Romance Languages and Literatures in 1953. As a graduate student, he was awarded a Fulbright Fellowship (1950–51) to study in Rome, adding Italian to the languages in which he had native fluency.

On completion of his graduate studies Brombert joined the Yale Department of Romance Languages and Literatures. He was appointed Benjamin F. Barge Professor in 1968 and was chair of his department from 1964 to 1973. In 1975 he moved to Princeton, where he had been appointed Henry Putnam University Professor and was affiliated with the Departments of Comparative Literature and Romance Languages and Literatures. At Princeton, he was also Director of Princeton's Christian Gauss Seminars in Criticism and chairman of its Council of the Humanities. He entered emeritus status in 1999.

Brombert was a visiting professor at many universities in the U.S. and Europe: the University of California (Berkeley); Johns Hopkins University; Columbia University; New York University; the University of Colorado; the Scuola Normale Superiore (Pisa, Italy); the Collège de France (Paris); the University of Bologna; the University of Puerto Rico.

== Personal life and death ==
In 1950, he married Beth Archer, a translator from French and Italian, and the author of the biographies Cristina: Portraits of a Princess and Édouard Manet: Rebel in a Frock Coat. The couple had two children, Lauren and Marc. Brombert died at his home in Princeton, New Jersey, on November 26, 2024, at the age of 101.

== Awards ==
Brombert held fellowships from the American Council of Learned Societies (1967) and from the Guggenheim Foundation (1954–55; 1970). He was Phi Beta Kappa Visiting Scholar in 1986–87 and 1989–90, and a scholar-in-residence at the Rockefeller Foundation in Triangolo lariano, Italy, in 1975 and in 1990. He was elected to the American Academy of Arts and Sciences in 1974, and to the American Philosophical Society in 1987. He holds honorary degrees from the University of Chicago (Doctor of Humane Letters, 1981) and the University of Toronto (Doctor of Laws, 1997). In 1985 he was awarded the Wilbur Cross Medal of the Yale Alumni Association for "distinguished achievements in scholarship, teaching, academic administration, and public service.” In France, he was honored with the Médaille Vermeil de la Ville de Paris " (1985) and was made Commandeur des Palmes Académiques (2008) and Chevalier de la Légion d’Honneur (2009).

In 1988–89 he served as president of the Modern Language Association.

== Publications ==
Brombert's work was primarily on 19th and 20th century French literature, and also on the history of ideas; the theory of literary criticism; and comparative studies of Italian, Russian, and German narrative writers. In addition to his books, he contributed to edited volumes and written journal articles on French writers from Pascal to Malraux, Sartre, and Camus, and on many non-French writers: Dostoevsky, Gogol, Tolstoy; Büchner, Max Frisch, Kafka, Thomas Mann; Giorgio Bassani, Primo Levi, Italo Svevo; J. M. Coetzee, Virginia Woolf.

Brombert was also the author of a memoir, Trains of Thought: Memories of a Stateless Youth (New York: W.W. Norton, 2002; paperback, Anchor Books, 2004).

In the words of a reviewer in The Wall Street Journal (December 27, 2013), “Victor Brombert...has been for more than 50 years one of the glories of humanistic scholarship at Yale and Princeton. Though a generation younger than scholarly patriarchs like Erich Auerbach and Leo Spitzer, Mr. Brombert has nonetheless shown himself comparably learned and cosmopolitan in his studies...”

Principal Works of Literary Criticism:

- The Criticism of T.S. Eliot (New Haven: Yale University Press, 1949)
- Stendhal et la voie oblique (Paris: Presses Universitaires de France, 1954)
- The Intellectual Hero: Studies in the French Novel, 1880–1955 (Philadelphia and New York: Lippincott, 1961; Chicago: University of Chicago Press, 1964).
- The Novels of Flaubert: A Study of Themes and Techniques (Princeton: Princeton University Press, 1966)
- Stendhal: Fiction and the Themes of Freedom (New York: Random House, 1968)
- Flaubert par lui-même (Paris: Éditions du Seuil, 1971)
- La prison romantique (Paris: Librairie José Corti, 1976). English trans. The Romantic Prison (Princeton: Princeton University Press, 1978). Awarded the Harry Levin Prize in Comparative Literature in 1978
- Victor Hugo and the Visionary Novel (Cambridge, Massachusetts: Harvard University Press, 1984).
- The Hidden Reader: Stendhal, Balzac, Hugo, Baudelaire, Flaubert (Cambridge, Massachusetts: Harvard University Press, 1988).
- In Praise of Antiheroes. Figures and Themes in Modern European Literature, 1830–1980 (Chicago: University of Chicago Press, 1999).
- Musings on Mortality. From Tolstoy to Primo Levi (Chicago: University of Chicago Press, 2013). Selected as the 2013 winner of the Robert Penn Warren-Cleanth Brooks award for outstanding literary criticism.
- The Pensive Citadel (Chicago: University of Chicago Press, 2023). Foreword by Christy Wampole.

as Editor:

- Stendhal: A Collection of Critical Essays (Englewood Cliffs, New Jersey.: Prentice Hall, 1962)
- Balzac’s “La peau de chagrin” (New York: Laurel Edition, 1962)
- The Hero in Literature: Major Essays on the Changing Concepts of Heroism from Classical Times to the Present (Greenwich, Connecticut, Fawcett Publications, 1969)
- Flaubert’s “Madame Bovary” (Cambridge, Massachusetts: Gallimard/Schoenhof's, 1986)
