= The Harry S. Truman Research Institute for the Advancement of Peace =

Peace research institute in Jerusalem

The Harry S. Truman Research Institute for the Advancement of Peace (Hebrew: מכון טרומן) is a research institute at the Hebrew University of Jerusalem, located on its Mount Scopus campus. It was the first, and is the largest, research institute in Israel and the Middle East that studies advancing peace in the region.

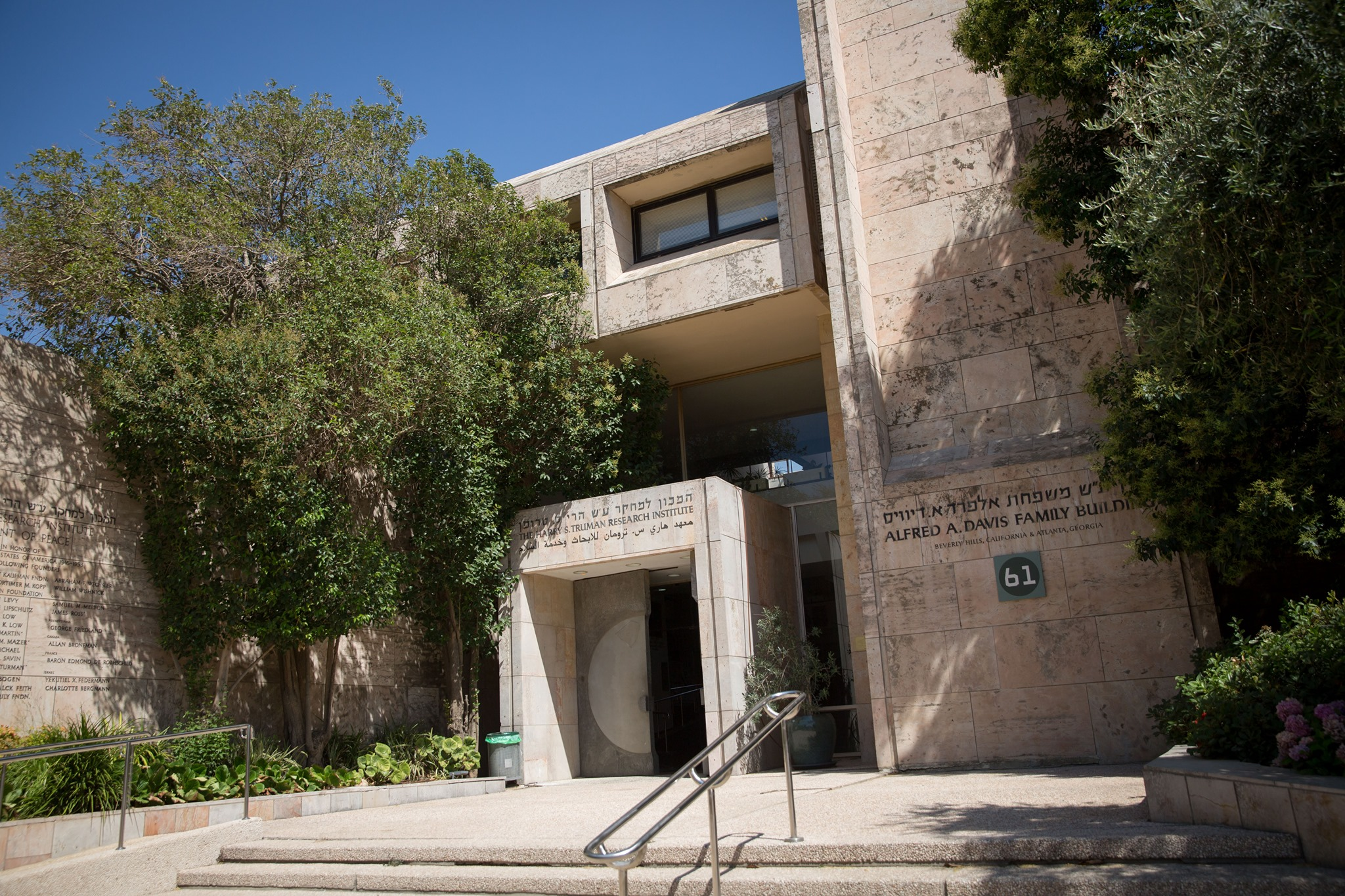
The Harry S. Truman Research Institute for the Advancement of Peace

== Goals ==
At the institute's initiation ceremony in July 1966, it was declared that the institute shall "become a center for studies dedicated to the pursuit of peace, which it is hoped will make a significant contribution to the fostering of international harmony and the advancement of cooperation between the peoples of the world". Today, the institute operates in two areas in relation to peace and conflict resolution: activities in the academic sphere and activities in the public sphere, serving as a platform for academic and public discourse and action in peace and conflict resolution. While the heart of the institute's research and activities relate to studying and exploring the Israeli-Arab conflict, Jerusalem and the Middle East, the Truman Institute also promotes research and thought about peace and conflict resolution in the rest of the world. It examines conflict and resolution processes from historical, cultural, psychological, political, and socio-economic perspectives. The institute has a doctoral and post-doctoral scholarship program, supports research projects conducted by senior researchers in Israel and abroad, as well as symposiums, workshops and meetings between individuals from a wide range of backgrounds, including scholars, statespersons, diplomats, students, journalists and activists.

== History ==
The Truman Institute was founded in 1966 with the encouragement and support of 33rd US president Harry S. Truman, who was in office during the declaration of the establishment of the State of Israel by David Ben Gurion. President Harry Truman was the first international leader to recognize the state of Israel. The establishment of the institute took several years from its official founding in 1966 to the completion of the construction of its building in 1970. Dr. Eliyahu Eilat, who was the first Israeli ambassador to the United States (1948–1950), actively campaigned to advance the development of a research institute dedicated to peace at the Hebrew University after the end of his tenure as the president of the Hebrew University (1962–1968). The initiation ceremony for the institute's building took place in May 1970. The building was constructed next to Mt. Scopus campus' amphitheater and was among the first buildings to be constructed on the campus following the 1967 Six Day War and the university's return to Mt. Scopus.

== The Truman Peace Prize ==
Between 1991 and 2013 the institute awarded the Truman Peace Prize (formerly known as "The Gitelson Peace Award") to "individuals who have made a significant contribution to the advancement of peace regionally or throughout the world." This reward reflects the Truman Institute's commitment to the promotion of peace. The winners of the prize over the years:

- 1991 – Former French Health Minister Simone Veil – In recognition for her contribution towards European understanding of the Israeli–Palestinian conflict.
- 1994 – Former Norwegian Foreign Minister Johan Jorgen Holst – In recognition for his contribution to bringing about a rapprochement between the peoples of the Middle East and leading to a new atmosphere in the relationship between formerly hostile peoples. The prize was awarded posthumously.
- 1999 – Former US Senator George Mitchell – In recognition for his persistent contribution of wise counsel, sensitive diplomacy and unflagging determination and for his lead role in brokering the Good Friday Peace Agreement.
- 2001 – Former US ambassador Richard Holbrooke – In recognition of his pivotal contribution to bringing the conflict in Bosnia closer to resolution.
- 2006 – US General (ret.) Colin L. Powell – In recognition of his contribution to fighting the war on terror, his fervent advocacy of the universal ideal of democracy and his skillful employment of diplomacy to build trust and forge alliances.
- 2008 – Former US ambassador Dennis B. Ross – In recognition of his contributions to building bridges of understanding between nations while upholding his personal commitment to the principles of democracy, freedom and pluralism; in appreciation of his extraordinary diplomatic skills and tireless efforts in the pursuit of peace in the Middle East; and in tribute to his steadfast support for the State of Israel.
- 2011 – Former head of the World Bank, Sir James D. Wolfensohn – In recognition of his contribution to the peace process between Israel and the Palestinians; in appreciation of his exceptional insight and leadership with regards to the diplomatic process; and in tribute to his concern for the wellbeing of Israel and the Palestinian people.
- 2013 – Former American Secretary of State, Secretary of the Treasury and Secretary of Labor the Honorable George P. Shultz – In recognition for his commitment to advance peace negotiations between Israel and her neighbors, while strengthening Israel's defensive capabilities; his unceasing efforts to secure the right of the Jews in the former Soviet Union to emigrate to Israel and to other countries in the free world; and to acknowledge his leadership role in the efforts to stabilize Israel's economy in the 1980s.

== Activities ==
The institute hosts the following:

- The Stanley and Roberta Bogen Library, whose vast collection of journals and special archives support the institute's research areas.
- The Abba Eban Centre for Israeli Diplomacy, which promotes connections among ambassadors and parliamentary representatives from around the world.
- The Abba Eban Archive - which contains the personal archive of Abba Eban, Israel's former foreign minister.

The Truman Institute serves as a research and cooperation platform for over 50 research fellows, who come from various backgrounds and diverse areas of expertise. Discourse is promoted about peace and conflict resolution and the institute tackles historical as well as current events. In 2022, the Truman Institute held events such as: 40 Years since the First Lebanon War, One Year since the May 2021 Riots, and a 4-part movie series. In 2021, while most events moved online due to the COVID pandemic, the Truman Institute held several books launches for our researcher's publications as well as webinars on the Russian invasion of Ukraine and the prisoner escape from Gilboa prison. In 2020, the Truman Institute announced the publication of the Truman Institute’s Atlas of Maps of the Israeli-Arab Conflict, edited by the Institute research fellow Dr. Shaul Arieli. It can be downloaded for free in Hebrew, English, Arabic, French, German, and Russian. Also in 2020, the institute held events analyzing the assassination of Qasem Soleimani, how COVID-19 might influence the conflict between Israel and Hamas in Gaza, the annexation plan of the Jordan Valley and more. In 2019, former US president, Jimmy Carter, gave a special and exclusive address (which can be found in the institute's YouTube channel) as part of the Truman Peace Conference whose topic was the 40th anniversary for the Israeli-Egyptian peace accords. In addition, the Institute runs a special scholarship program for doctoral and post-doctoral students whose research deals with the topic of peace and conflict resolution.

== Heads of the Institute ==
- Prof. Ernst D. Bergmann 1966–1975
- Prof. Moshe Ma'oz 1975–1979
- Prof. Harold Z. Schiffrin 1979–1987
- Prof. Ben-Ami Shillony 1987–1990
- Prof. Naomi Chazan 1990–1992
- Prof. Moshe Ma'oz 1992–1998
- Prof. Amnon Cohen 1998–2003
- Prof. Eyal Ben-Ari 2003–2007
- Prof. Mario Sznajder 2005–2006 (served as interim head)
- Prof. Haim D. Rabinowitch 2007–2009
- Prof. Steven Kaplan 2009–2012
- Prof. Menahem Blondheim 2012–2018
- Dr. Oded Lowenheim 2018–2019 (served as interim head)
- Prof. Vered Vinitzki-Seroussi 2018–2022
- Prof. Ifat Maoz 2022–present

Several noteworthy figures served as the Chair of the Truman Institute's Board of Trustees, such as American ambassadors to Israel William Brown (who held the position for 25 years) and Samuel Lewis, American diplomat Max Kampelman, former Israeli ambassador to the United States Moshe Arad and former Israeli minister and politician Dan Meridor (who currently holds the position).

== See also ==
- List of peace activists
