= Maximilian Lerner =

American soldier (1924–2022)

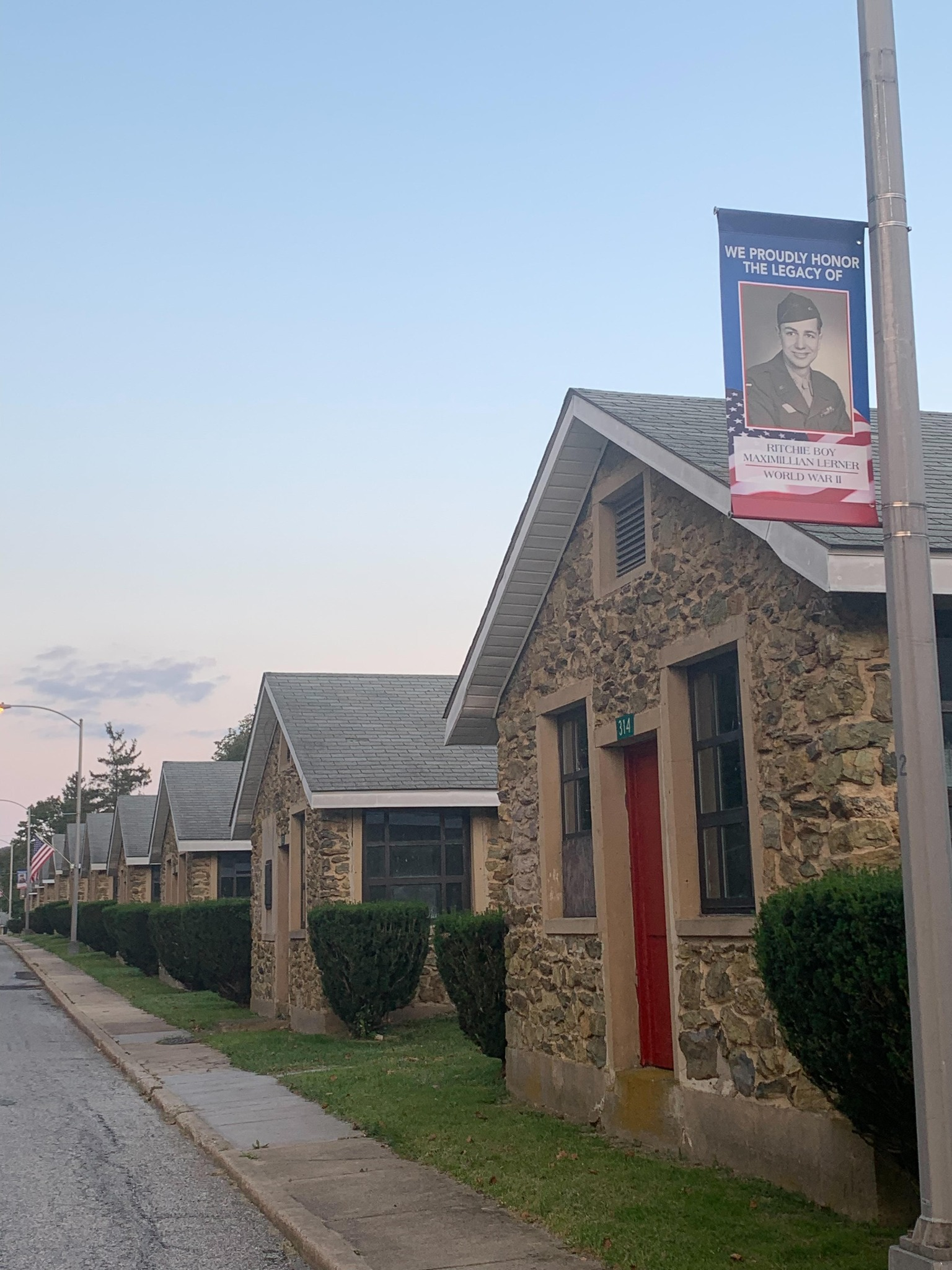
- Maximilian Lerner's banner hanging at Camp Ritchie following his passing in 2022.
- Born: September 4, 1924; Vienna, Austria
- Died: September 10, 2022 (aged 98); Manhattan, New York City, United States

Maximilian Lerner (September 4, 1924 – September 10, 2022) was an Austrian-born American known for his work in the Military Intelligence Service during World War II. His training at Camp Ritchie during the war classifies him as one of the Ritchie Boys.

== Early life ==
Lerner was born in Vienna, Austria on September 4, 1924, the son of a furrier and a homemaker. Shortly after the German annexation of Austria in 1938, his family moved to Paris, later to Nice, France. Lerner learned French while he attended high school in France. The family moved on to Manhattan, New York in 1941, where he attended high school at night while he worked during the day. He then became fluent in English.

== Army career ==
Lerner enlisted in the U.S. Army on his 18th birthday. After basic training, he was sent to Camp Ritchie, a training center for military intelligence. In March 1944, he was sent to Northern Ireland with the Office of Strategic Services, where he received further intelligence training from British operatives. After D-Day, he spent a short time in Paris to interview people who had been arrested by the French Resistance and sort out ordinary citizens from Nazi collaborators and soldiers. After two weeks in Paris, he was transferred to Verdun, France, where he was based for most of the rest of the war and served missions for the Office of Strategic Services.

In March 1945, Lerner went to Germany, where he remained in the final days of the war and during the denazification process.

== Later life ==
After returning from the war, Lerner attended school on the G.I. Bill and received a bachelor's degree from City College of New York and in 1952 a master's degree from Columbia University. He started a horticultural products business and raised a family. Lerner was one of four Ritchie Boys to be interviewed by 60 Minutes for his role in military intelligence during World War II. He wrote a memoir and two spy novels. He died on September 10, 2022, in Manhattan.

== Memoir ==
- Lerner, Maximilian (2013). Flight and Return: A Memoir of World War II. ISBN 978-1493786558.
