= Julius Stern (banker) =

German banker

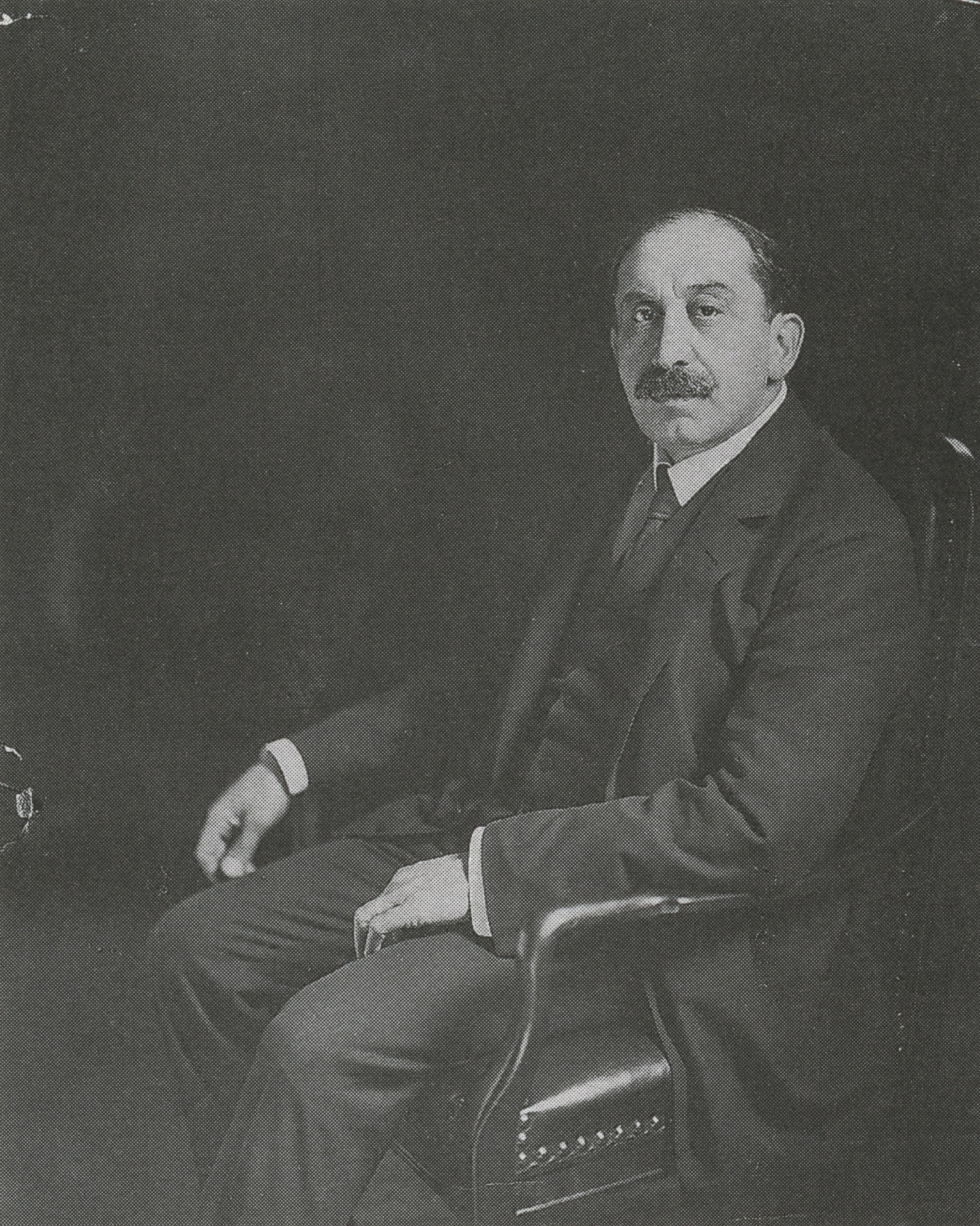
- Julius Stern c. 1912
- Born: July 26, 1858; Hamburg, Germany
- Died: February 23, 1914 (aged 55)} Berlin, Germany
- Occupations: Banker, art collector, and philanthropist
- Known for: Most important collection of modern art in Germany before the First World War
- Spouse: Malgonia Karpeles
- Children: 1

Julius Bernhard Stern (born 26 July 1858 in Hamburg; died 23 March 1914 in Berlin) was a German Jewish banker, art collector and philanthropist.

== Life ==
Julius Stern was born in Hamburg in 1858, the son of Moritz Stern (1807-1887) et Mathilde Sterna (1829-1886). He became a director of the National Bank for Germany in 1883 at the age of 24. He held this position until his death in 1914. He also held numerous supervisory board positions, including at the Dresdner Bank and the arms manufacturer Ludwig Loewe & Co.

Julius Stern was married to Malgonia Karpeles (1871-1914). The couple lived at 6a Bellevuestraße in Berlin's upmarket Tiergarten district. From 1912, the Sterns had a country house built for them by Paul Baumgarten in Geltow near Potsdam. Baumgarten had previously built villas on Berlin's Wannsee, including the Liebermann Villa. The architect and designer Henry van de Velde created part of the interior design for both the Berlin flat and the Stern villa in Geltow. The Stern couple moved in an artistic environment. Malgonia Stern was a pupil of the painter Dora Hitz, the writer Otto Julius Bierbaum dedicated a poem to her and the sculptor Georg Kolbe created a portrait bust of her. Julius Stern had himself portrayed several times by the painter Max Liebermann (painting in the Kunstmuseum Gelsenkirchen, painting study in private ownership, pastel painting in the Museum Ostwall in Dortmund). The Sterns' circle of friends included the art historian Julius Meier-Graefe, the Berlin Secession painters Leo von König and Eugene Spiro, and Spiro's wife, the actress Tilla Durieux.

Julius Stern was a member of the Verein für deutsche Volkskunde. As a patron of the arts, he supported young artists, promoted the art critic Karl Scheffler and was a patron of the Berlin National Gallery, to which he donated the portrait of a little girl by Dora Hitz in 1897. In 1912, together with other art lovers, he acquired the drawing estate of the architect and designer Joseph Maria Olbrich, which went as a foundation to the Berlin Museum of Decorative Arts and the Art Library of the National Museums in Berlin. The Kupferstichkabinett Berlin received five etchings and twelve lithographs by Max Liebermann from Stern in 1911. In 1912, etchings by Rudolf Großmann, Hans Meid and Waldemar Rösler followed as a further gift.

== Art collection ==
Julius Stern's art collection comprised more than 200 works and was one of the most important collections of modern art in Germany before the First World War. In addition to artists of the Berlin Secession, Stern collected pictures of French Impressionism, Late Impressionism and the Nabis.

In addition to the portraits Max Liebermann painted of Julius Stern, Stern's collection included Garden of the Old Man's House in Amsterdam, Emperor Friedrich's Memorial Party near Kösen, Dutch Sewing School, Horse Servants on the Beach, Beer Garden and Corso on Monte Pincio. He also owned Woman with Flowers by Lovis Corinth, Trotting Races (today National Gallery Berlin) by Max Slevogt, Red Tulips in a Green Jar and Apples and Grapes on a Plate by Curt Herrmann, Merano Landscape and Pine Forest by Walter Leistikow, In the Café by Lesser Ury, Landscape in a Thunderstorm (View of Lankwitz and Marienfelde) by Max Beckmann (today Wallraf-Richartz-Museum & Fondation Corboud, Cologne), Dorfhäuser (Village Houses) by Leopold von Kalckreuth, Gardeoffizier im Walde (Guard Officer in the Woods) by Wilhelm Trübner and the works Reigen (Round Dance), Allegorie (Allegory) and Sommerfreunde (Summer Friends) by Ludwig von Hofmann.

Works by French artists in the Stern Collection included Street Vendor with Dog and Bouquet of Flowers in a Jar by Jean-François Raffaëlli, Woman's Head by Édouard Manet, Port in Trouville (today Szépművészeti Múzeum, Budapest), Garden in Vetheuil, Poppy Field near Vetheuil (today Foundation Collection E. G. Bührle, Zurich) by Claude Monet, Beach near Fécamps and the motif Park Pond with Geese by Berthe Morisot (today National Gallery of Art, Washington D.C.). Other Impressionist works in the Stern Collection were Sunset by Camille Pissarro, Bathers by Pierre-Auguste Renoir, Shore of the Seine by Alfred Sisley, Child with Cat by the American Mary Cassatt, who lived in Paris, and Three Russian Dancers by Edgar Degas, drawn in coloured chalk (today Swedish National Museum, Stockholm).

Late Impressionist paintings in the Stern Collection were Tulips in a Vase (now Norton Simon Museum, Pasadena) by Paul Cézanne, Garden at Arles (destroyed in World War II) and Olive Harvest at Arles (now National Gallery of Art, Washington D.C.) by Vincent van Gogh and Te arii vahine (now Pushkin Museum, Moscow) by Paul Gauguin. Examples of Pointillism include Park Landscape by Henri Edmond Cross, The Port in Rotterdam by Paul Signac and Hilly Landscape by Théo van Rysselberghe. Other paintings in the collection were the Symbolist depiction Girlfriends by Eugène Carrière and the landscape painting The Seine at Bonnières by Georgette Agutte. There were a number of paintings by the Nabis group of artists in the Stern Collection. These included the motif Racecourse by Pierre Bonnard, the works Bathers, Easter Sunday, Beach with Bathers, Idyll, Churchyard in Italy and Nuns at Mass by Maurice Denis, and the paintings At the Dining Table and Zimmerbild by Édouard Vuillard. In addition, Julius Stern was one of the first collectors in Germany to own a painting by Pablo Picasso. The painting Lady in a Hoop Skirt from 1901, which belongs to the early work, is today in the Ny Carlsberg Glyptotek in Copenhagen.

== Death and legacy ==
Julius Stern died on 23 March 1914 at the age of 56 during a conference at the National Bank. His coffin was laid out in front of his picture gallery and dignatories from the world of finance, commerce, politics as well as art and science attended his funeral, including the Vice-President of the German Reichstag. Max Liebermann delivered the eulogy. After speeches by the art historian Julius Meier-Graefe (1867-1935) and the architect Henry van de Velde (1863-1957), Stern was buried in the Jewish cemetery

His widow, Malgonia lent the Stern collection to the first exhibition of the Freie Secession, at Kurfürstendamm from 11 April 1914. She committed suicide on 20 May 1914, leaving behind their fifteen year old son. After the death of Julius Stern and his wife Malgonia, the estate was auctioned at the Cassirer auction house in 1916. In addition to the art collection, this also included European and Asian arts and crafts.

The Sterns were Jewish and Julius' and Malgonia's son Werner Otto Stern (1899-1942) was murdered at the Nazi concentration camp of Sobibor in Poland.

== Literature ==
- Cella-Margaretha Girardet: Jüdische Mäzene für die Preußischen Museen zu Berlin, eine Studie zum Mäzenatentum im Deutschen Kaiserreich und in der Weimarer Republik. Hänsel-Hohenhausen, Egelsbach 1997, ISBN 3-8267-1133-5.
- Erich Hancke: Die Sammlung Stern. In: Kunst und Künstler, 1910, Heft 11, S. 536–548.
- Johann Georg Prinz von Hohenzollern, Peter-Klaus Schuster (Hrsg.): Manet bis van Gogh, Hugo von Tschudi und der Kampf um die Moderne. Nationalgalerie Berlin und Neue Pinakothek München 1996, ISBN 3-7913-1748-2.
- Kunstsalon Paul Cassirer, Hugo Helbing (Hrsg.): Sammlung Julius Stern, Berlin. Auktionskatalog, Cassirer, Berlin 1916.
- Andrea Pophanken, Felix Billeter: Die Moderne und ihre Sammler, Französische Kunst in deutschem Privatbesitz vom Kaiserreich zur Weimarer Republik. Akademie Verlag, Berlin 2001, ISBN 3-05-003546-3.
