= Arnold M. Silver =

Arnold M. Silver was a CIA operations officer.

== Biography ==
Silver graduated at Tufts University and received a master's degree in German philology from Harvard University in 1942. During the second world war he participated in the Normandy landings and later became a prisoner-of-war interrogator (IPW), trainings which he mastered while at Camp Ritchie in which he was one of the Ritchie Boys. In September 1945 he joined the IPW team in Oberursel, near Frankfurt-am-Main, at the 7707th European Intelligence Center. Many of the Paperclip scientists were recruited there and Silver interrogated Otto Skorzeny, Walter Schellenberg, and Richard Kauder.

In 1948, he retired from the Army as a technical sergeant and joined the newly formed CIA. Silver served as CIA Chief of Station in Luxembourg from 1957 to 1960. He retired from the CIA in 1978 and settled in Luxembourg, but continued publishing articles on European and Soviet affairs in newspapers such as The Wall Street Journal and The Herald Tribune.

He died of multiple myeloma on December 16, 1993, at his home in Luxembourg City.
