= Toby E. Rodes =

Swiss business consultant and design critic

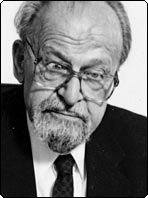
- Born: 25 October 1919; Frankfurt am Main, Germany
- Died: 20 April 2013 (aged 93); Basel, Switzerland
- Occupations: Business consultant, design-critic, journalist
- Known for: Public relations and interior design
- Spouse: W.E. Rodes-Bauer

Toby E. Rodes (25 October 1919 – 20 April 2013) was a German American business consultant, design-critic, journalist and, on occasion, lecturer, who has concerned himself for more than 60 years with public relations and interior design. He was the founder of an international public relations and marketing agency located in Basel.

== Early life ==
Toby E. Rodes' father, Charles A. Rosenthal, who was a banker and businessman, restructured the Phillip Holzmann AG in Frankfurt after the global economic crisis of 1928. He was a 3rd generation American with German and Hungarian roots and studied law in Munich. Toby's American grandfather was a painter. His published Portrait of Johann Sebastian Bach's family has marked our vision of the composer.

Toby E. Rodes' mother, Olivia Veit, came from a rare union between a noble English family with an old German-Jewish one. Before her marriage, she was a celebrated German actress. Cultural diversity and multilingualism were taken for granted in the Rosenthal family.

In 1934, at the Lessing Senior High School in Frankfurt a biology teacher made an anti-Semitic speech in front of Toby's class. After this incident Toby left the school forever and went to French Switzerland, where he attended an English High School on Lake Geneva. He studied accounting at the London School of Economics. He left for the United States in 1937 and studied international finance at the American Institute of Banking/Columbia University and law at New York University.

== Career ==
Toby E. Rodes returned to Europe in World War II. Initially he worked under General C. Powell in a leading position in the Psychological Warfare detachment of the 12th US Army Group. His training at Camp Ritchie in Maryland makes him one of the Ritchie Boys. Then under Lucius D. Clay in the Information Control staff of the US Army in Europe, which dealt with the reconstruction of the German media. From 1950 to 1955 he was in the US diplomatic service as Chief of Public Relations for the Marshall Plan and did Public Relations work for the Schumann Plan, the predecessor of the European Union, produced films and directed exhibitions, etc.

From 1955 to 1966 he was a member of the management team of Knoll International, being responsible for their activities outside of North and Central America and CEO of the German, Italian, Swiss and Liechtenstein subsidiaries. Since then he regularly visits important interior design trade shows as a reporter for design magazines and participates from time to time in international design juries.

At the same time, from 1953 to 1975, he was a member of the executive committee of the board of Julius Klein Public Relations Inc, known for its strategic counseling concerning the solution of delicate international economic communications problems.

In 1966, he established the Toby E. Rodes Consultants Agency in Basel, a full-service agency acting as counselors and executing public relations programs, including controversial international activities.

== Personal life ==
He was married to Dr. h.c. Sc W.E. Rodes-Bauer for 40 years. They lived in Basel.

== Memberships ==
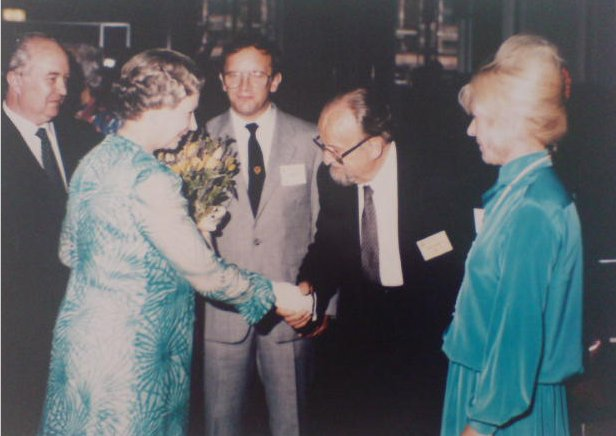
Shaking hands with: her Majesty Queen Elisabeth II, Toby E. Rodes and his wife

As a member of numerous national and international professional associations, particularly of the Swiss Public Relations Society, Toby E. Rodes devoted much time and effort to further future communications experts.

He was a Fellow of the Royal Society of Art, London and a member of NPRG/BG IPRA, PRSA-Counselors Academy and Swiss Commission for Integrity in Commercial Communication.

His International Communications & Marketing Consultants agency was located in Basel, Switzerland.

== Recognition ==
On 1 December 2005 he was awarded the highest medal of the German State of Hesse for his service to democracy and reconstruction of Germany after World War II. He also was awarded:

- Médaille de la Reconnaissance française
- US Bronze Star Medal and other recognitions
- Croix de guerre avec étoile d‘argent, Luxemburg

== Publications ==
“Ein hessischer Amerikaner und die Stunde Null” (a Hessian American and the hour zero), a 43-minute TV film about his life produced in the “Zeitreise” series (A travel through times passed) by the Hessian State TV first showing on Dec.07.2006 and later twice by Phoenix TV. He published several books including:

- “A Short Introduction to Public Relations” . Hohwacht-Verlag 1977. ISBN 3-87353-056-2
- “11 Thesen zur Kommunikation”. Urheber- Verlag, Bonn/Remagen 2005. ISBN 3-88540-025-1
