= Lewen =

Lewen is a surname, and may refer to:

- George Lewen (died 1743), British politician
- Lars Lewén (born 1975), Swedish freestyle skier
- Si Lewen (1918–2016), Polish-American painter
- William Lewen (c.1657–1722), British merchant and politician, uncle of George Lewen

== See also ==
- Tim Lewens (born 1974), British historian and philosopher
- Lewin
