= Eric Pleskow =

Austrian-born American film producer (1924–2019)

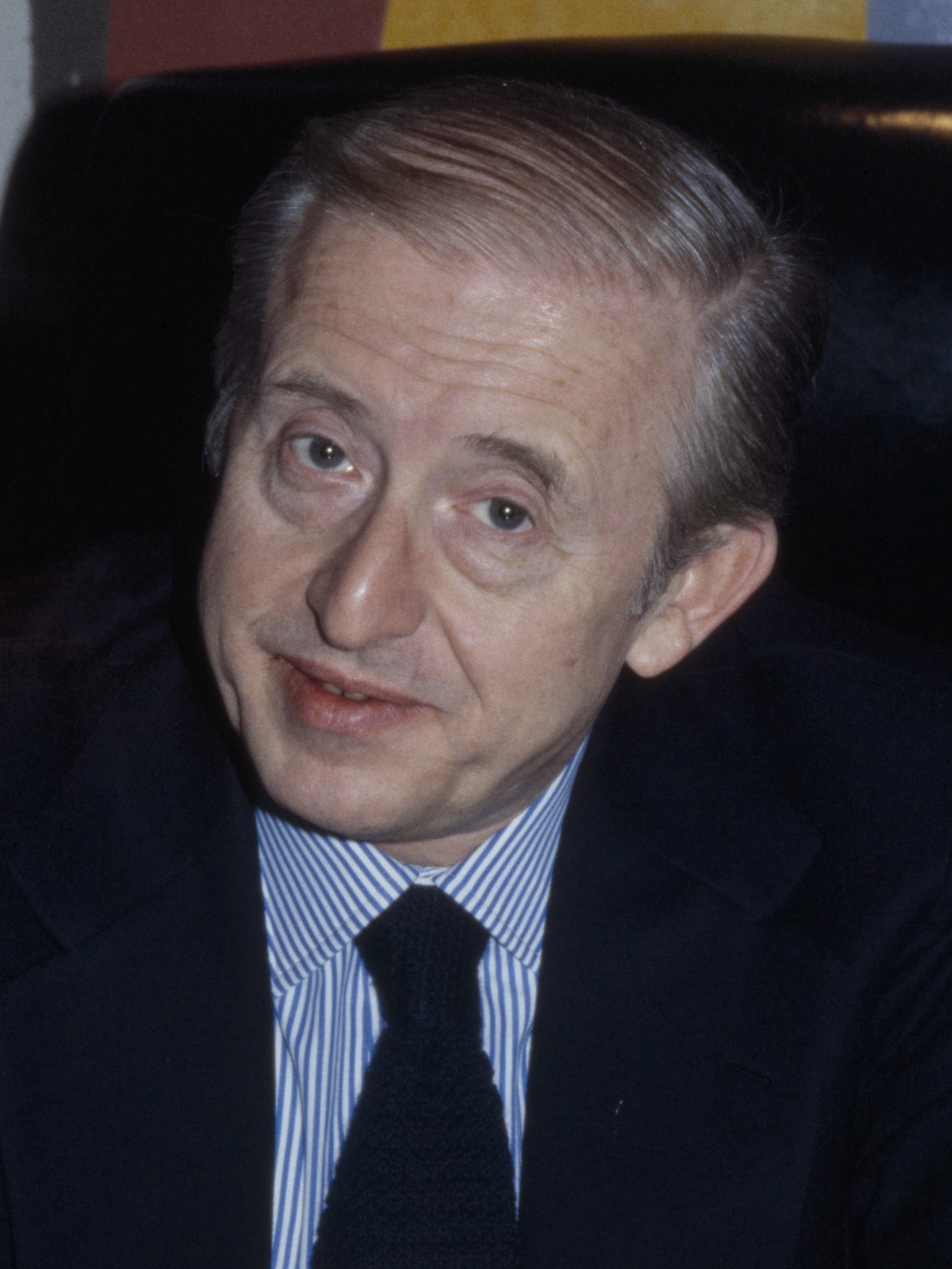
- Pleskow in 1978
- Born: Erich Pleskoff; April 24, 1924; Vienna, Austria
- Died: October 1, 2019 (aged 95); Westport, Connecticut, U.S.
- Occupations: Film producer, executive
- Known for: President of United Artists and Orion Pictures

Eric Pleskow (born Erich Pleskoff; April 24, 1924 – October 1, 2019) was an Austrian-born American film producer and executive. From 1973 through 1978, Pleskow was president of United Artists. Following a protest from Transamerica Corporation, Pleskow co-founded and later ran Orion Pictures in 1978 through 1991. In his later career, he served as president of the Vienna International Film Festival from 1998 until his death.

== Early life ==
Born Erich Pleskoff in Vienna, he was the son of Jewish merchants. After the Anschluss and the following Aryanization of their apartment, the family emigrated to the United States in 1938.

In 1943, he was conscripted into the United States Army. His training in Military Intelligence at Camp Ritchie makes him one of the Ritchie Boys. After World War II, Pleskow returned to Austria and guided five interrogations during denazifications.

== Career ==
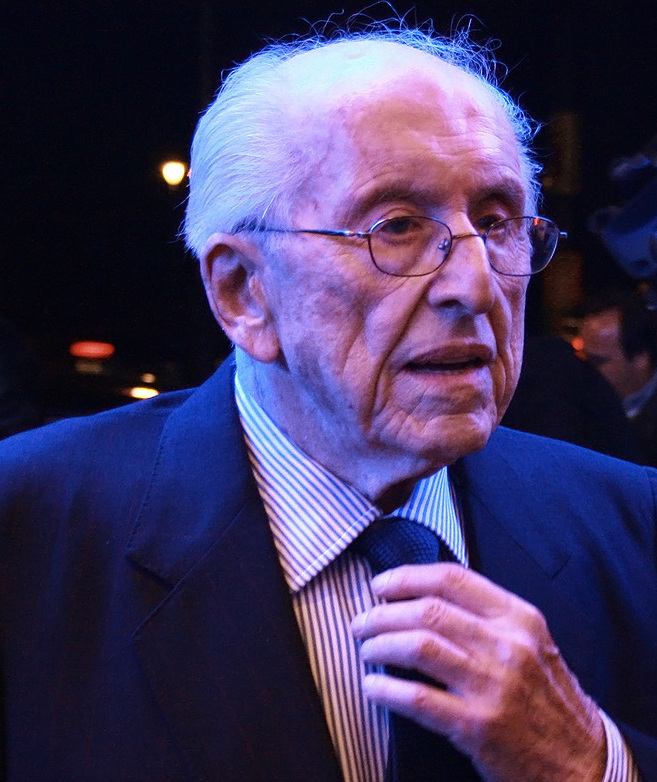
Pleskow at the 2012 Viennale

Due to his brief education in film editing, which he finished before joining the army, he became film officer for the United States War Department in 1945. He was assigned to rebuild the Bavaria Film Studios in Munich, Germany.

In 1951, he went to work for United Artists as a foreign department executive in their New York City office and moved to South Africa (1952) and Germany (1953-8) before becoming continental manager in Paris (1958–62). In 1962, Pleskow traveled back to New York City as vice president of international distribution. On January 1, 1973 he was made chief operating officer, taking over from David V. Picker who became chief executive officer but soon became the president and CEO after Picker left UA that year. Under his presidency at United Artists, the company won the Academy Award for Best Picture three years in a row: One Flew Over the Cuckoo's Nest (1975), Rocky (1976) and Annie Hall (1977).

In 1978, Pleskow along with many executives from United Artists, formed Orion Pictures as a protest due to the constant interference from parent company Transamerica Corporation in the running of United Artists. He was a key figure in establishing $100 million in financing for Orion, including distribution through Warner Bros. He was named president and CEO, a post he held until 1991. He became chairman but resigned July 1, 1992. Their greatest successes under his management were Amadeus (1984), Platoon (1986), Dances with Wolves (1990) and The Silence of the Lambs (1991) which all won the Academy Award for Best Picture. He also greenlit Little Man Tate (1990) and The Addams Family.

In 1998, Pleskow became president of the Vienna International Film Festival. In February 2007, he was awarded honorary citizenship of Vienna.

During his career, Pleskow was involved in the production of fourteen best-picture Oscar winners.

== Death ==
Pleskow died on October 1, 2019, in Westport, Connecticut, at the age of 95.

== Bibliography ==
- Andrea Ernst: Eric Pleskow. Ein Leben für den Film. Picus Verlag, Wien 2008, ISBN 978-3-85452-632-2.
