= Joseph Mugnaini =

American painter (1912–1992)

Joseph Anthony Mugnaini (July 12, 1912, in Viareggio, Province of Lucca – January 23, 1992) was an Italian-born American artist and illustrator. He is best known for his collaborations with writer Ray Bradbury, beginning in 1952.

== Biography ==
He was born Giuseppe Mugnaini in Viareggio in the Tuscany region of Italy and immigrated with his family to America when he was three months old. He and his family resided on Solano Avenue in Los Angeles, California, during the 1930s, and Altadena during the late 1950s. He became an American citizen in 1941.

He trained at Camp Ritchie in the 10th class and is one of the Ritchie Boys of World War II.

He taught art at the Pasadena School of Fine Arts, among others.

He died in Los Angeles on January 23, 1992.

== Bibliography ==
Books by Mugnaini include:

- Drawing: A Search for Form (1965)
- Oil painting: Techniques and Materials (1969)
- The Hidden Elements of Drawing (1974)
- Joseph Mugnaini: Drawings and Graphics (1982)
- Expressive Drawing: A Schematic Approach (1989)
