= Joseph W. Eaton =

Joseph W. Eaton, born Josef Wechsler (September 28, 1919 – October 15, 2012), was an American sociologist who published widely in the fields of social work, sociology, public health, and public and international affairs.

== Biography ==
Eaton was born in Nuremberg, Germany, the son of Jakob Wechsler and Flora Wechsler (née Goldschmidt). His father owned a shaving brush factory. When the business failed following the stock market crash, the family moved to Berlin, in 1930. After the Nazis came to power in Germany in 1933, Joseph's parents arranged for him and a younger brother to emigrate to the United States by themselves, with the assistance of the German Jewish Children's Aid program; two older brothers had already left for Palestine. Joseph arrived in New York in November 1934, at the age of 15.

In 1943 he was drafted into the Army, and thanks to his language skills was assigned to Camp Ritchie and became a journalist for the Supreme Headquarters Allied Expeditionary Force (SHAEF), with duties that included writing leaflets to be dropped behind enemy lines. By that time he had changed his last name to Eaton (the name of his foster family), out of concern for the safety of his parents, who were then living in the Netherlands, under Nazi occupation. They were killed in Sobibór in 1943.

Eaton graduated from Cornell University in 1940, and completed his Ph.D. in sociology at Columbia University in 1948. He spent most of his professional career at the University of Pittsburgh, where he was appointed professor of social work research in the School of Social Work in 1959. He is credited with the creation of a masters of social work research major there, and, in the 1980s, organized the dual degree program between Pitt's School of Social Work and the Graduate School of Public and International Affairs.
