= Hashish, the Paradise of Hell =

1921 film

- Directed by: Reinhard Bruck
- Written by: August Lembach
- Starring: Tilla Durieux; Fritz Kortner; Paul Hartmann
- Cinematography: Mutz Greenbaum
- Production company: Akme-Film
- Distributed by: Unitas-Film
- Release date: 7 February 1921
- Country: Germany
- Languages: Silent; German intertitles

Hashish, the Paradise of Hell (German: Haschisch, das Paradies der Hölle) is a 1921 German silent drama film directed by Reinhard Bruck and starring Tilla Durieux, Fritz Kortner and Paul Hartmann.

The film's sets were designed by the art director Robert Neppach.

== Cast ==
- Tilla Durieux as Sultanin
- Fritz Kortner as Sultan
- Paul Hartmann as Der Jüngling
- Eva Seeberg as Die Braut
- Fritz Beckmann
- Paula Conrad as Addali - Assas Mutter
- Wilhelm Diegelmann as Ober Enuch
- Friedrich Kühne as Selim
- Hermann Picha
- Leopold von Ledebur as Hassan - Aminas Artz

== Bibliography ==
- Grange, William. Cultural Chronicle of the Weimar Republic. Scarecrow Press, 2008.
