= Ludwig Katzenellenbogen =

German brewery director

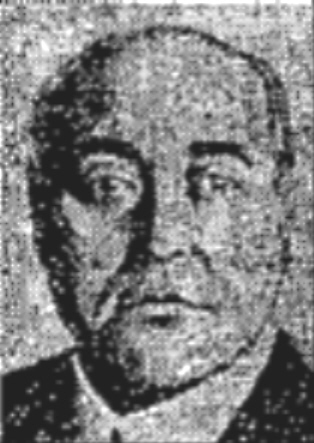
Ludwig Katzenellenbogen

Ludwig Katzenellenbogen (born 21 February 1877 in Krotoschin, German Empire; died 30 May 1944 in Berlin) was a German brewery director deported by the Nazis to the Sachsenhausen concentration camp.

== Life ==
His father, Adolph Katzenellenbogen (1834-1903), founded the alcohol distillery in what was then Krotoschin (now Krotoszyn). In 1903, Ludwig became head of his father's business, and founded the Spiritus headquarters in Berlin (later nationalized).

At the end of 1924, a consortium under his leadership acquired a large block of shares in Mitteldeutsche Creditbank, in which his cousin, Albert (1863-after 1933) sat on the board. After the death of Adolf Jarislowsky's son Alfred (1929), the way was clear for the merger with Commerzbank. He became general manager of the Ostwerke-Schultheiß-Patzenhofer brewery in Berlin. Ostwerke was a group of spirit, cement, yeast, glass, and machine factories, and ran into difficulties after the takeover of Schultheiß-Patzenhofer-Brauerei and as a result of the economic crisis, at the end of the 1920s.

Until 1930, Ludwig Katzenellenbogen was married to Estella Marcuse (1886-1991), the daughter of a physician. Their children were the political scientist Konrad Kellen (1913-2007), and younger sisters Estella and Leonie. They lived in the Freienhagen manor house, outside Liebenwalde, north of Berlin.

In 1930, Katzenellenbogen married the actress Tilla Durieux, and helped her to finance the Piscatorbühne (Piscator Theatre) at Berlin's Nollendorfplatz.

== Art collection ==
Katzenellenbogen has an important art collection which included "Rehe" Dammwild Roes, "Bacchant" by Lovis Corinth, a self portrait by Oskar Kokoschka, "Chemin de Plaine avec une porte de jardin a droite" by Pissarro, as well as many other works.

== Nazi persecution ==
When the Nazis came to power, the couple fled with two suitcases and 200 marks. In 1933, he fled with Tilla Durieux, first to Ascona in Switzerland, and emigrated from there, in 1935, to Zagreb (Kingdom of Yugoslavia), where a distant relative of his wife lived. While she was trying to obtain a visa in Belgrade for both of them to emigrate to the US, she was surprised by the German bombing and raid on Belgrade in April 1941, and was thus separated from her husband. Katzenellenbogen was arrested by the Gestapo in Saloniki in 1941, and deported to the Sachsenhausen concentration camp north of Berlin. He died in 1944 in the Jewish Hospital Berlin.

== Post-war search for Nazi-looted art ==
The heirs of Ludwig and Estella Katzenellenbogen have listed fifty artworks with the German Lost Art Foundation.

== Commemoration ==
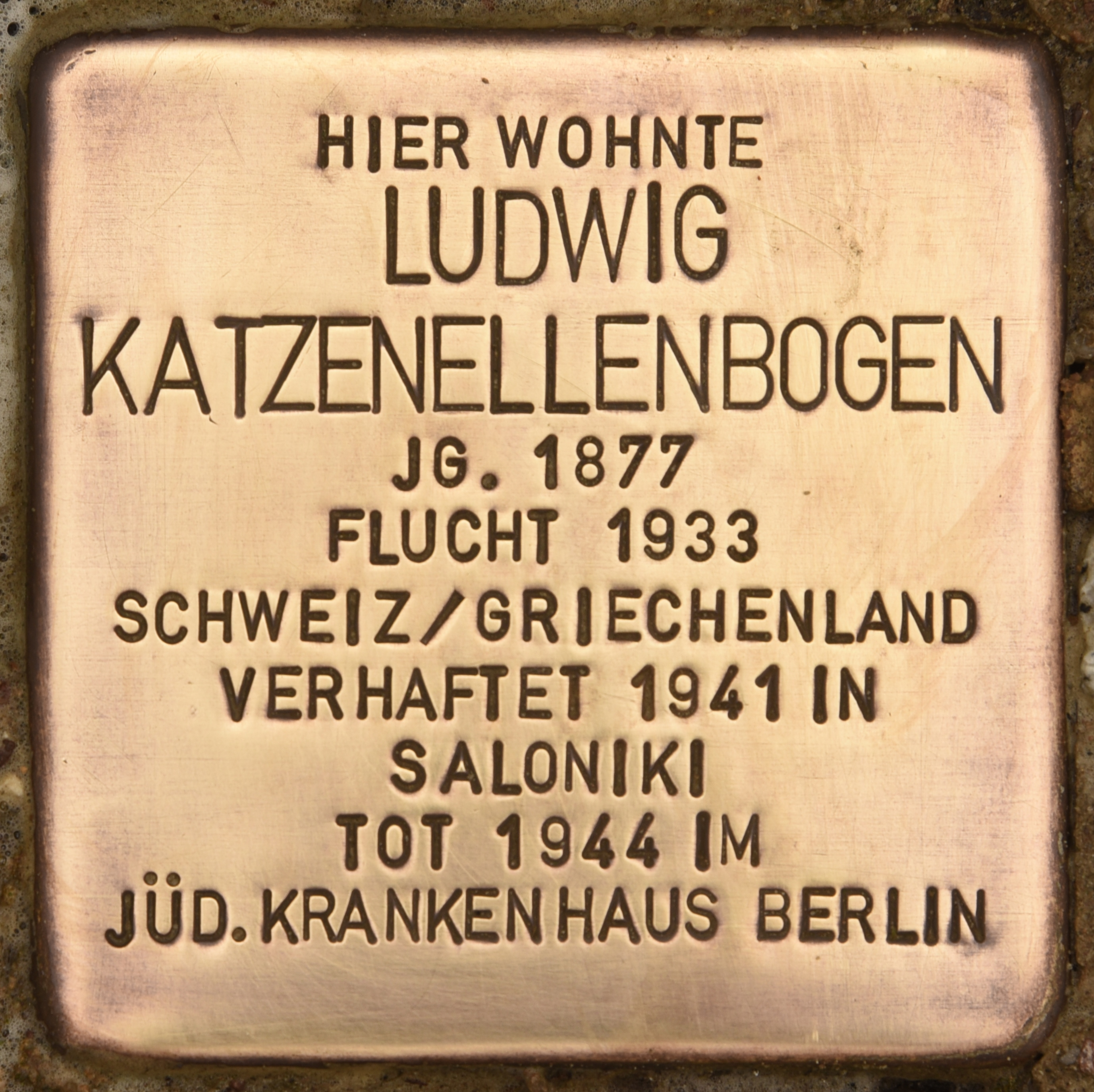
Stolperstein in Liebenwalde

In Liebenwalde, commemorative stumbling blocks were laid for Ludwig Katzenellenbogen and other family members by the artist Gunter Demnig.

== Literature ==
- Joseph Walk (Hrsg.): Kurzbiographien zur Geschichte der Juden 1918–1945. Hrsg. vom Leo Baeck Institute, Jerusalem. Saur, München 1988, ISBN 3-598-10477-4.
- Tilla Durieux: Meine ersten neunzig Jahre. Herbig, München 1971 (dort meist L. K. genannt)
- Katzenellenbogen, Ludwig, in: Werner Röder, Herbert A. Strauss (Hrsg.): Biographisches Handbuch der deutschsprachigen Emigration nach 1933. Band 1: Politik, Wirtschaft, Öffentliches Leben. München : Saur, 1980, S. 354
