= Eugene Spiro =

German-American painter

Eugene Spiro, born Eugen Spiro (April 18, 1874 in Breslau, Silesia – September 26, 1972 in New York City) was a German and American painter.

He was born to a Jewish family in Breslau. His younger sister was the painter Baladine Klossowska. The French painter Balthus was his nephew.

The following biographical summary is taken from primary sources including the artist's own collected papers and letters, as well as the archives of the German Academy of the Arts in Berlin.

== Early career ==
In 1900, Spiro became a member of the Vienna Secession.

In 1903, he traveled to Venice, then to Paris.

In 1904, he married the Austrian actress Tilla Durieux Tilla Durieux, from whom he divorced in 1905, and who later married the important art dealer Paul Cassirer.

In 1906, he became a member of the Berlin Secession. That same year, he moved to Paris and met the German painter and graphic artist Hans Purrmann. He regularly traveled to Berlin for art exhibitions.

In 1911, he was appointed to the Prussian Academy of Arts in Berlin.

In 1917, Spiro married his second wife, Elizabeth Saenger-Sethe. They had a son, Peter Spiro, born in Berlin in 1918. During the interwar period (1918–1935), the couple traveled extensively—to Northern Italy (Lake Maggiore), Paris, the south of France (Cassis), Corsica, Spain, Portugal, Morocco, and Croatia.

== French period ==
In 1935, Eugene Spiro left Germany due to his Jewish origins and the Nazi regime's antisemitic policies. The Spiro family settled in Paris.

From 1936 to 1939, he went to Sanary-sur-Mer, where many intellectuals opposed to the Nazi regime had gathered. Some of them founded the Union of Free Artists in 1936, including Max Beckmann, George Grosz, Wassily Kandinsky, Paul Klee, Oskar Kokoschka, and Wols. In 1938, in response to Nazi propaganda about "degenerate art," Spiro joined the International League Against Anti-Semitism.

In 1940, with the German invasion of France, the Spiro family fled to Biarritz, then to Marseille. In Marseille, André Breton, Hans Bellmer, and Tristan Tzara helped protect the Spiros from the threats of Marshal Pétain’s collaborationist regime. In 1940, the artist was nevertheless briefly interred at the Vichy regime's prison camp at Gurs before his journey to the United States via Spain.

== American period ==
In the spring of 1941, the Spiro family managed to flee to the United States and settled in New York. Eugene Spiro remarried Lilly Jacobi, whom he had known during his time in exile in Paris.

In 1943, Eugene Spiro exhibited at the Galerie St. Etienne in New York and the Salmagundi Art Club in New York, holding seven solo exhibitions.

In the 1950s, Eugene Spiro returned to Germany. He traveled to Denmark, Switzerland, France, and England.

In 1964, he was awarded the Order of Merit of the Federal Republic of Germany.

In 1969, Berlin organized a major retrospective of his works at the Berlinische Gallerie.

He died in New York on September 26, 1972.
