= Estella Katzenellenbogen =

Estella Katzenellenbogen, née Marcuse (born February 24, 1886 in Berlin; died February 17, 1991 in San Diego), was a German art collector and gallery owner.

== Life ==
Estella Katzenellenbogen was born in 1886 as the daughter of the physician Moritz Marcuse and his wife Louise, née Gumpertz, in Berlin. In 1912, she married the banker and entrepreneur Ludwig Katzenellenbogen. Their son Konrad (Konrad Kellen), was born in 1913, and daughters Leonie in 1918 and Estella Ruth in 1921. Her sister Leonie (Kato) Marcuse was married to Max Katzenellenbogen, a relative of her husband.

Estella and Ludwig Katzenellenbogen were wealthy with apartments furnished with antiques and artworks. The couple lived alternately in Berlin and in the countryside in Brandenburg, where they owned the manor in Freienhagen since 1913. In Berlin, they first lived at Keithstr. 8 in Berlin-Schöneberg, and starting in 1927, in a villa at Bendlerstr. 40 in the Tiergarten district. Estella Katzenellenbogen operated a series of flower shops in Berlin.

== Art collection ==
Katzenellenbogen was most famous as an art collector of East Asian art as well as German and French Impressionist and Expressionist artists. This collection included works by Paul Cézanne, Vincent van Gogh, Édouard Manet, Claude Monet, Pierre-Auguste Renoir, Camille Pissarro, Alfred Sisley, Max Liebermann, Oskar Kokoschka, and Paul Klee as well as Peter Paul Rubens and sculptures by August Gaul. To decorate the hall at the Freienhagen estate, the couple commissioned Lovis Corinth. He created a series of eleven paintings in 1913/1914 with motifs from Homer's Odyssey and Ludovico Ariosto's Orlando furioso. This cycle is now partially housed in the Berlinische Galerie.

== Marriage and divorce ==
Estella Katzenellenbogen was rumored to have had an extramarital affair with the art dealer Paul Cassirer. After his suicide in 1926, she began a liaison with Albert Einstein, with whom she attended concerts and receptions, and whom she visited at his summer house in Caputh. Meanwhile, Ludwig Katzenellenbogen had a relationship with the actress Tilla Durieux, who had previously been married to Paul Cassirer. In 1929, Estella and Ludwig Katzenellenbogen divorced. He married Tilla Durieux in 1930. After the divorce, Estella Katzenellenbogen kept the villa on Bendlerstr., while her ex-husband continued to live at the Freienhagen estate.

Their joint art collection was divided. Estella Katzenellenbogen, for example, received the Corinth cycle, as well as paintings such as L’Allée au Jas de Bouffan by Paul Cézanne (now in the Musée d’art et d’histoire, Geneva), Lyon by Oskar Kokoschka (Phillips Collection, Washington D.C.), Messalina by Henri de Toulouse-Lautrec (Stiftung Sammlung E. G. Bührle, Zurich), and Pertuiset, the Lion Hunter by Édouard Manet (Museu de Arte de São Paulo).

== Nazi persecution and emigration ==
When the Nazis came to power in Germany in 1933 Estella Katzenellenbogen and her family were persecuted because of their Jewish origins, even though she had been baptized as a Protestant. She left Germany for Switzerland in 1936 and emigrated to the United States in May 1939, living in California from then on. Her children had also settled there. She was able to take part of her art collection with her into exile, where she lived partly from the sale of the works. The rest of her belongings were confiscated by German customs and subsequently auctioned off.

Her former husband Ludwig was deported by the Nazis to Sachsenhausen concentration camp in 1941.

Her son Konrad served as the private secretary of Thomas Mann.

== Life in California ==
In the Los Angeles area, Estella was part of the cultural scene of German-speaking exiles. Her son Konrad worked from April 1941 as secretary to Thomas Mann, with whom Estella Katzenellenbogen was repeatedly invited to tea.[13] In 1943, he changed his surname to Kellen and took part in the war against Germany as a US soldier. From 1944, Estella Katzenellenbogen ran a branch of the Nierendorf Gallery at 8650 Sunset Boulevard in Los Angeles, which traded mainly in works by Paul Klee. The gallery closed again in 1945. Estella Katzenellenbogen died in San Diego in 1991.

== Post-war search for Nazi-looted art ==
The heirs of Ludwig and Estella Katzenellenbogen have listed fifty artworks with the German Lost Art Foundation.

A settlement was reached between the Gettys and the Katzenellenbogen heirs concerning Manet's Tête du chien "Bob"

== Literature ==
- Anna-Carolin Augustin: Berliner Kunstmatronage: Sammlerinnen und Förderinnen bildender Kunst um 1900, Wallstein Verlag, Göttingen 2018, ISBN 978-3-8353-3180-8.
- Alice Calaprice, Daniel Kennefick, Robert Schulmann: An Einstein encyclopedia. Princeton University Press, Princeton, New Jersey 2015, ISBN 978-0-691-14174-9.
- Konrad Kellen: Mein Boss, der Zauberer: Thomas Manns Sekretär erzählt. Rowohlt, Reinbek 2011, ISBN 978-3-498-03537-2.
