= Paul Cassirer =

German art dealer (1871–1926)

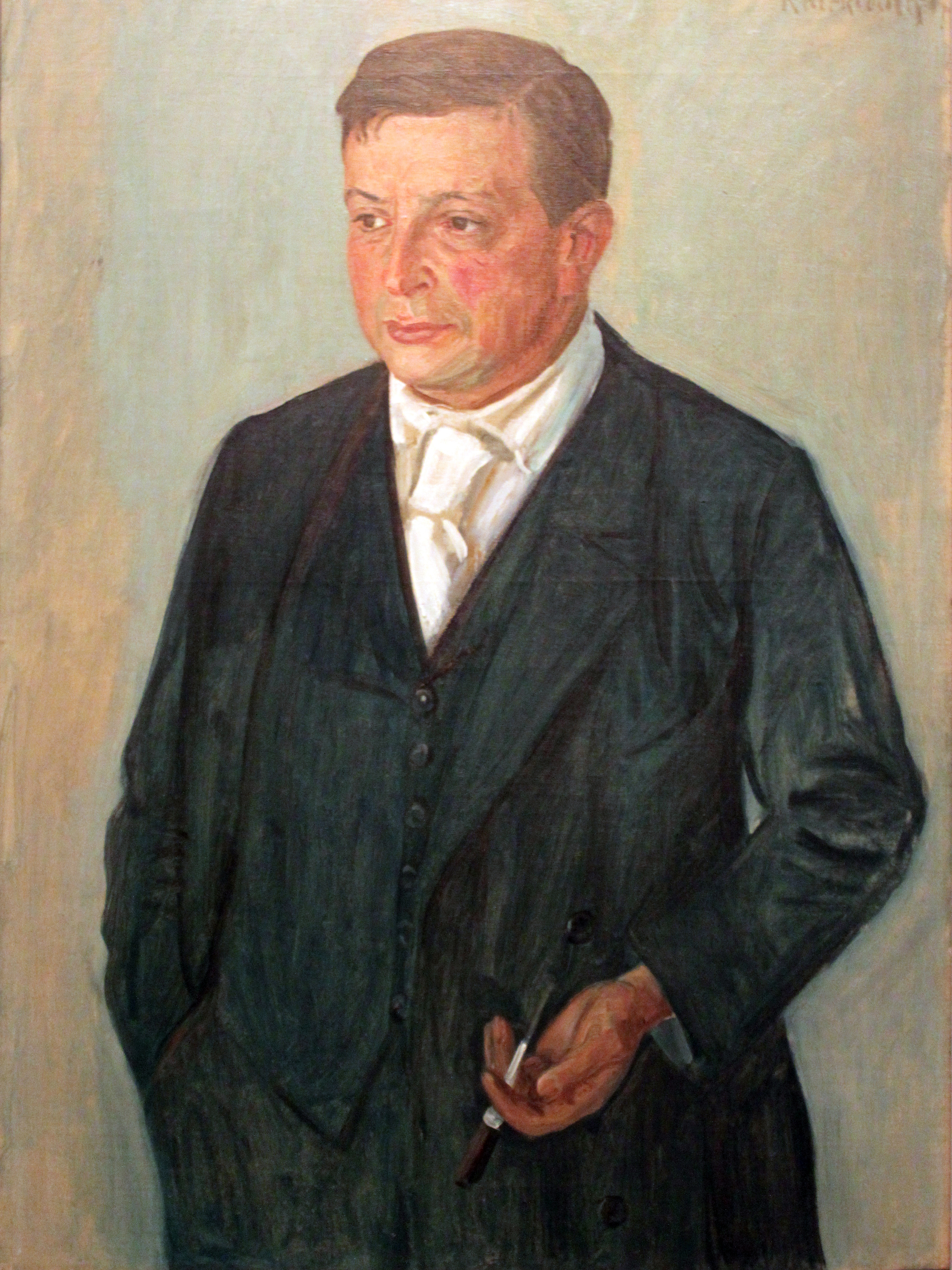
Portrait of Paul Cassirer by Leopold von Kalckreuth, 1912

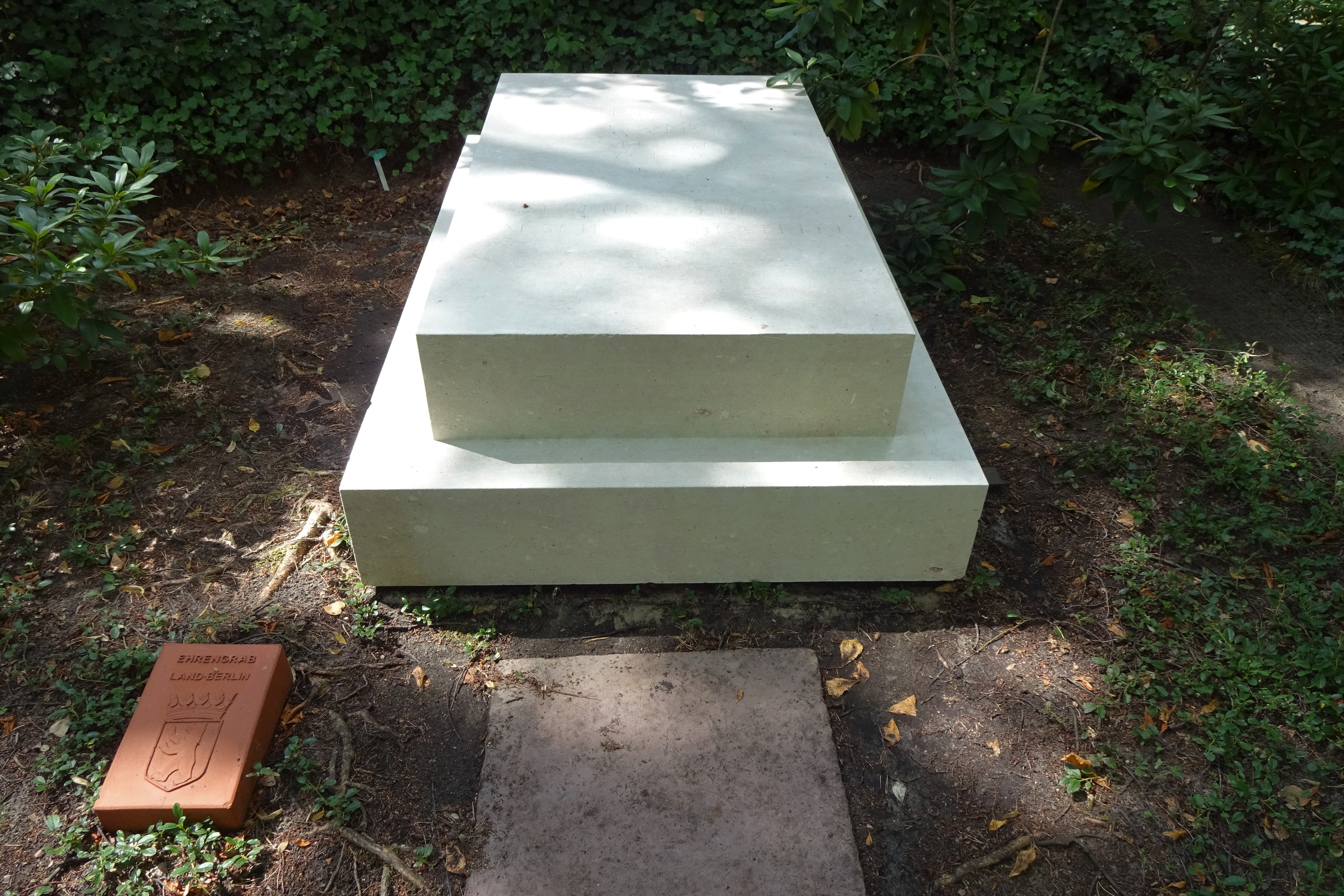
Paul Cassirer's grave in Friedhof Heerstraße, Berlin-Westend, designed by Georg Kolbe

Paul Cassirer (21 February 1871, in Görlitz – 7 January 1926, in Berlin) was a German art dealer and editor who played a significant role in the promotion of the work of artists of the Berlin Secession and of French Impressionists and Post-Impressionists, in particular that of Vincent van Gogh and Paul Cézanne.

== Starting out ==
Paul Cassirer started out as a student of art history, and then became a writer in 1890s Munich, where he worked for the weekly magazine Simplicissimus and published two novels.

Cassirer moved to Berlin, and he and his cousin Bruno, while still in their mid 20s, opened their gallery on the ground floor of Paul's house in the up-market Viktoriastrasse. The cousins came from a prominent family, whose members included the neurologist Richard Cassirer and the philosopher Ernst Cassirer. Paul was born into a Jewish family. His father, Louis, was an engineer and businessman, whose company — Kabelwerke Dr. Cassirer & Co. — manufactured telegraphic cables, and was eventually taken over by Siemens.

In 1895 he married Lucie Oberwarth.

In 1901 Cassirer visited Julien Leclercq's retrospective of Van Gogh's work, and later that year he organized the inclusion of five Van Gogh canvases in the May show of the Berlin Secession.

On 21 May 1904, Cassirer and Lucie divorced.

== Second marriage ==
In 1910 he married Ottilie Godefroy (18 August 1880, Vienna – 21 February 1971, Berlin), the actress well known under her pseudonym Tilla Durieux. Tilla had very briefly been married to the painter Eugen Spiro six years earlier. She and Cassirer were married for sixteen years, but the union was to end tragically.

In 1910 Cassirer also resurrected the periodical Pan.

== Art dealing and collecting ==
On April 11, 1900, Paul Cassirer purchased "Rue St. Honoré, après midi, effet de pluie", by French Impressionist Camille Pissarro (the “Painting”). from Durand-Ruel. Julius Cassirer acquired it from him, passing it to Lilly Cassirer Neubauer, after his death. The painting has been the object of a claim for restitution for Nazi-looted art by the Cassirer family

Together with Hugo Helbing, Cassirer formed an auction house starting around 1916. Auctions of major artworks were held there, including the Julius Stern Collection, in 1916.

== Death ==
On 7 January 1926, Cassirer met his wife in a lawyer's office to finalize the divorce proceedings. He excused himself and walked into another room, where he shot himself. Like that of Van Gogh, the artist he had done so much to promote, Cassirer's suicide was not immediately successful. He died from the injury a few hours later.

== Resources ==
=== References ===
- Brühl, Georg: Die Cassirers: Streiter für den Impressionismus, Edition Leipzig, Leipzig 1991, ISBN 3-361-00302-4
- Feilchenfeldt, Rahel E., & Brandis, Markus: Paul Cassirer Verlag, Berlin 1898-1933. Eine kommentierte Bibliographie, K. G. Saur, München 2002, ISBN 3-598-11578-4
- Paret, Peter: The Berlin Secession. Modernism and its enemies in Imperial Germany, Harvard University Press 1980
- Saltzman, Cynthia: Portrait of Dr Gachet, Viking Penguin, 1998, ISBN 0-14-025487-0

== Research resources ==
- Cassirer collection, 1906-1933 (0.5 linear ft.) is housed in the Department of Special Collections and University Archives at Stanford University Libraries
