= Harold Zvi Schiffrin =

Israeli sociologist and intelligence officer (1922–2024)

Zvi Schiffrin
- צבי שיפרין
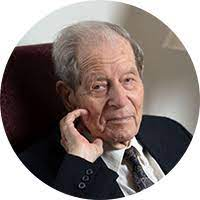
- Born: September 26, 1922; U.S.
- Died: 25 July 2024 (aged 101)

Academic background
- Education: University of California, Berkeley (BA, MA); Hebrew University of Jerusalem (PhD)

Harold Zvi Schiffrin (Hebrew: הרולד צבי שיפרין; 26 September 1922 – 25 July 2024) was an American-born Israeli sociologist and intelligence officer. He was a professor of East Asian Studies and Sociology at the Hebrew University of Jerusalem and the founder of East Asian studies in Israel.

== Biography ==
Harold Zvi Schiffrin was born on 26 September 1922 in Rochester, New York. In 1943, as a college student, he was conscripted into the US Army and stationed at the Pacific front. During his service, he was stationed at Camp Ritchie and is considered to be part of the Ritchie Boys. The army sent him to University of California, Berkeley, to study Chinese language and culture (1943–44); upon graduating, he was stationed in Manila, where there was at the time a large community of Chinese immigrants. In 1948, he settled in Mandatory Palestine to serve in the Mahal during the Arab-Israeli War. Between 1955 and 1957, he returned to Berkeley and completed his M.A. in Chinese Studies under the supervision of Robert A. Scalapino. He later pursued his PhD in Israel under S.N. Eisenstadt. In 1961, he received his PhD from the Department of Sociology, the Hebrew University and continued with postdoctoral research at Harvard University.

On his return, he joined the Hebrew University's academic staff. By 1958, he was offering courses in Chinese history, that were attracting large crowds of students. Throughout the 1960s, when history and languages of China and Japan were still considered an esoteric academic pursuit in Israel, he insisted on the centrality of East Asia in general, and China in particular, to the political and economic international arena. In 1968, his efforts culminated in the foundation of the Department of East Asian Studies at the Hebrew University. (then known as the Department of Chinese and Japanese Studies, the first of its kind in Israel. Japanese studies was represented at the time by Avraham Altman) Schiffrin laid the foundations for the research and teaching of Chinese Studies in Israel. He assembled to the department top researchers in the field and trained the next generations of East Asia researchers in Israel. He retired in 1990, and continued to research and participate in the department's life.

Schiffrin was also dean of the School for Overseas Students (1968–70), headed the Harry S. Truman Institute for the Advancement of Peace (1979–87), and chaired the US-Israel Educational Foundation (Fulbright Program; 1980–87). His activities on both national and international level for the aliyah of Jews from the Soviet Union and the release of Prisoners of Zion won worldwide recognition. He also held research and teaching positions at Harvard (1962–63) and Berkeley (1988–89), and was a guest of the Chinese Academy of Social Sciences, Beijing long before China and Israel established diplomatic relations. In 2010, he was chosen by the National Library of China as one of "the hundred greatest Sinologists of all times."

Schiffrin died on 25 July 2024, at the age of 101.

== Research ==
Schiffrin was an expert on the 1911 Revolution and on Sun Yat-Sen (孙中山1866–1925), the father of the Chinese republic and founder of modern China. He specializes in the social and intellectual history of modern China, and in particular the transition from Imperial China to the Republic (c. 1840–1949).

Sun Yat-Sen and the Origins of the Chinese Revolution (1968) In this book, Schiffrin reconstructs the life and times of Dr. Sun Yat-sen (1866–1925), the founding father of the Chinese revolution. The book follows Sun's early activities, up to 1905, when he established the Tongmenghui and developed the political philosophy known as the "Three Principles of the People". Schiffrin presents Sun – a peasants' offspring, who received western rather than classical Chinese education – as an instrumental leader whose vigor, dedication, and insistence that only through adopting an advanced republican government China would succeed in catching up and eventually overtaking the West, managed to gain him the sympathy of Chinese intellectuals. The book reconstructs the complex world of China at the end of the 19th and start of the 20th centuries, including the dying dynasty, the variety of local Chinese forces, and the foreign influence in southern China. It presents Sun's activities in China, Europe, Japan, and among the Overseas Chinese in their political, social and intellectual contexts. Schiffrin was the first Western researcher to use newspapers issued by Chinese students and exiles in Japan as an important source for his research. The book received the American Historical Association's John King Fairbank Prize for East Asian Studies in 1969. It was published in Chinese in both Mainland China and Taiwan and was reprinted – in the US and China – in 2010.

Sun Yat-sen, Reluctant Revolutionary (1980)

This sequel is a full biography of Sun Yat-sen. Analyzing his role in the 1911 Revolution, and his subsequent career as a founder of the Kuomintang, the book also reviews Sun's legacy in the PRC and Republic of China in Taiwan. Schiffrin explores Sun's activities in a wide range of contexts, highlighting the turning points in early 20th century Chinese history. This book remained the standard biography of Sun for several decades, and was reprinted in China in 2010.

The 1911 Revolution in China (1984, 1995)

The two volumes co-edited by Schiffrin and the Japanese scholar Eto Shinkichi (1923–2007), assemble Eastern and Western scholars, whose work sheds new light on the transitional period from Imperial to Republican China. Studies in these volumes discuss ideological, constitutional, ethnic, economic, political and biographical aspects, as well as the influence of Chinese Republican Revolution and its leaders in different parts of the world.

Military and State in Modern Asia (1976)

This collection of essays edited by Schiffrin examines the role of the army in the nation-states established in Asia in the 20th century, from East Asia to the Middle East. It presents case studies from Indonesia, Japan, China, Burma, Egypt and Syria, as well as a theoretical comparative discussion. The book integrates essays by leading historians and sociologists from Israel and worldwide. Schiffrin's own essay deals with the warlords during the Republican Period (1911–1949).

Schiffrin published many articles dealing with the political and intellectual history of China at the start of the 20th century and various aspects of modern Chinese history, such as foreign relations, the development of Chinese nationalism, China's military and economic policy, Chinese perceptions of the West, and intellectual life in contemporary China. He was an important contributor to the Biographical Dictionary of Republican China, ed. H. L. Boorman (Columbia University Press, 1967–1971) and also edited the China section of the Encyclopaedia Hebraica writing 50 different entries.

== Books ==
- Sun Yat-sen and the Origins of the Chinese Revolution. Berkeley: University of California, 1968, rpt. 2010.
- Sun Yat-sen: Reluctant Revolutionary. Boston: Little, Brown, and Company, 1980.
- Military and State in Modern Asia. Jerusalem: Academic Press, 1976.
- With Eto Shinkichi. The 1911 Revolution in China: Interpretative Essays. Tokyo: Tokyo University Press, 1984.
- With Eto Shinkichi. China’s Republican Revolution. Tokyo: Tokyo University Press, 1995.

In Chinese:

- .孙中山与中国革命的起源. Sun Zhongshan yu Zhongguo ge ming de qi yuan Sun Yat-sen and the Origins of the Chinese Revolution, Beijing: Zhongguo shehui kexue chubanshe, 1981.
- .孙中山: 勉为其难的革命家 [Sun Zhongshan: mian wei qi nan de ge ming jia,]. Beijing: Zhongguo huaqiao chubanshe, 1996.
- Schiffrin, Harold Z. [史扶邻]. 孙中山与中国革命Sun Zhongshan yu Zhongguo geming Sun Yat-sen and the Chinese Revolution. Taiyuan: Shanxi renmin chubanshe, 2010, 2 vols.
