= Eugene Ehrlich =

American lexicographer (1922–2008)

Eugene Ehrlich (21 May 1922 – 5 April 2008) was an American lexicographer and author.

He was a member of the Department of English and Comparative Literature at Columbia University, where he taught in the Department of General Studies. A reading specialist, he prepared generations of adult students for the rigors of university work after years of absence from any academic setting. His books about language are very well regarded for their clarity and humor and were introduced by such word luminaries as William F. Buckley, Richard Lederer, and Noah Adams, who also featured Mr. Ehrlich's language commentary on his public radio broadcasts. William Safire occasionally cited Mr. Ehrlich in his writing on language.

He was quoted as saying that his higher mission was "being the antidote to the 'effects wrought by the forces of linguistic darkness.'”

== Biography ==
Eugene Ehrlich was born in New York City in 1922. He attended CCNY before service in the United States Army during World War II. Trained to interrogate prisoners in Europe at the Army's language school at Boston College, as well as eight weeks of training at Camp Ritchie he was reassigned to the Pacific suddenly because events in France were developing too rapidly. He received crash training in Japanese, which he used in the Philippines, New Guinea, and occupied Japan. After the War, he did graduate work at Columbia Teachers College, taught at Fairleigh Dickinson University, and began work as a consultant to industry at Bell Laboratories, where his precise use of language helped scientists and engineers describe and communicate their discoveries. He later worked at Norden Aircraft, Sikorsky, Loral Aerospace and many others where he helped prepare contract proposals for vast government contracts.

He married Norma Solway in 1948. He has 4 children: Anne Ehrlich physician, Henry Ehrlich writer, Richard Ehrlich writer, and Jonathan Ehrlich attorney. He has 10 grandchildren. Eugene Ehrlich died on April 5, 2008, at home in Mamaroneck, New York.

== Books by Ehrlich ==
- The Oxford Illustrated Literary Guide to the United States (1982)
- The Highly Selective Thesaurus for the Extraordinarily Literate (1994)
- The Highly Selective Dictionary for the Extraordinarily Literate (1997)
- The Highly Selective Dictionary of Golden Adjectives for the Extraordinarily Literate (2002)
- The International Thesaurus of Quotations
- Choose the Right Word
- Modern French Linguistics: A Journey Through Time
- Amo, Amas, Amat and More
- Les Bons Mots: How to Amaze Tout le Monde with Everyday French
- The Art of Technical Writing
- How to Study Better and Get Higher Marks
- Oxford American Dictionary
- Veni, Vidi, Vici: Conquer Your Enemies, Impress Your Friends with Everyday Latin (2009 2nd edition))
- NBC Handbook of Pronunciation
- Writing and researching term papers and reports: A new guide for students
- What's in a Name?: How Proper Names Became Everyday Words
- Collins Gem Thesaurus
