= Tilla Durieux =

Austrian film and stage actress

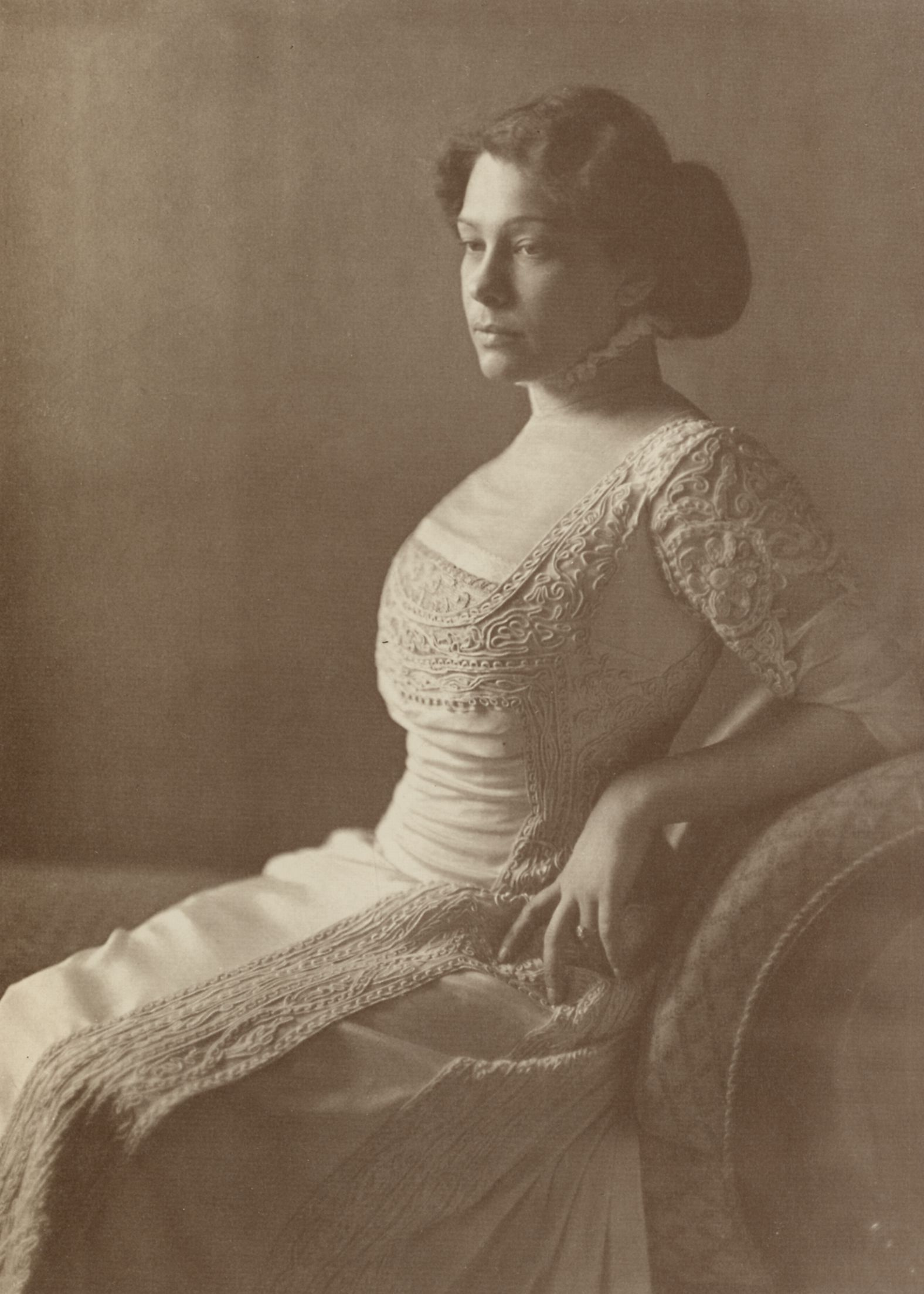
- Photograph by Jacob Hilsdorf (1905)
- Born: Ottilie Godeffroy; 18 August 1880; Vienna, Austria-Hungary
- Died: 21 February 1971 (aged 90); West Berlin, West Germany
- Occupation: Actress
- Years active: 1902–1970
- Spouses: Eugene Spiro (m. 1903; div. 1905) Paul Cassirer (m. 1910; div. 1926) Ludwig Katzenellenbogen (m. 1930; died 1944)

Tilla Durieux (born Ottilie Godeffroy; 18 August 1880 – 21 February 1971) was an Austrian theatre and film actress of the 20th century.

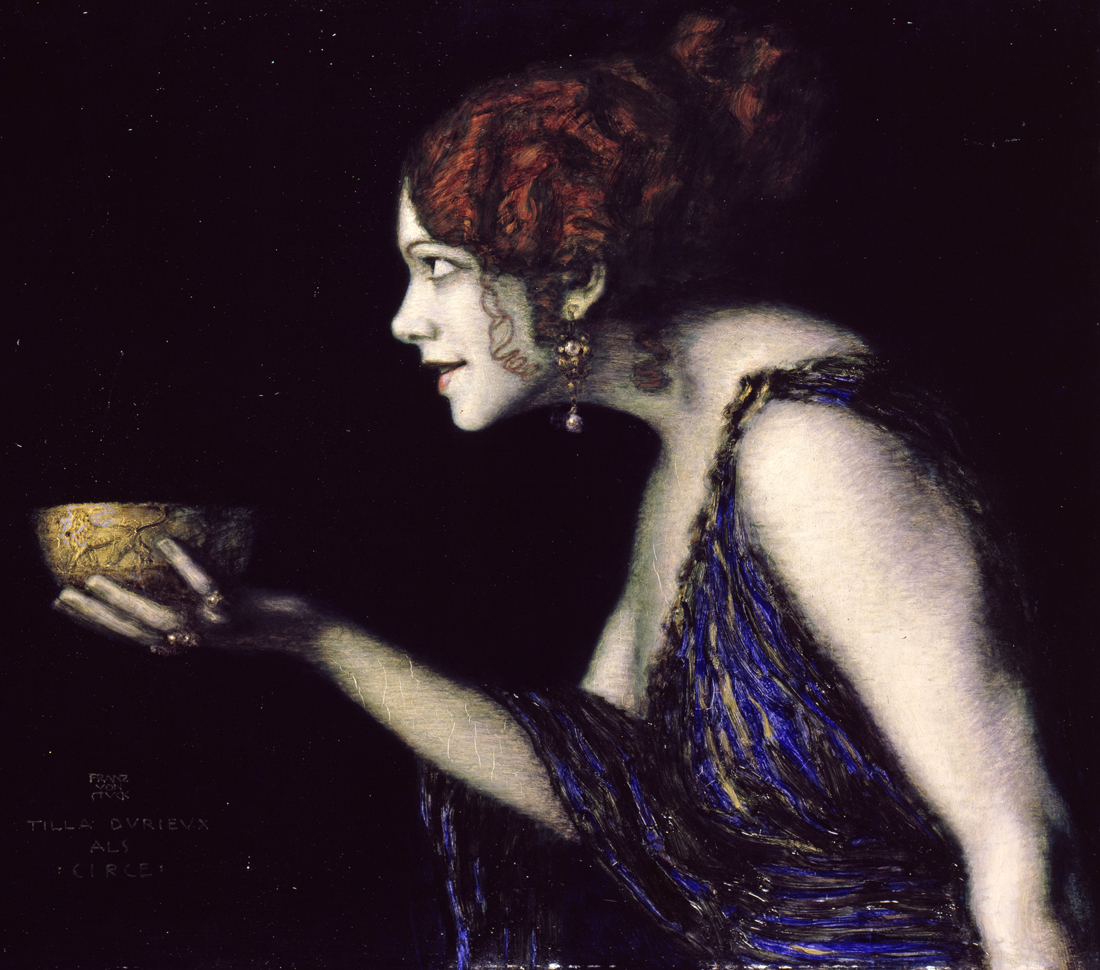
Franz Stuck's Tilla Durieux als Circe, c. 1913

== Early years ==
Born Ottilie Helene Angela Godeffroy on 18 August 1880 in Vienna, she was the daughter of the Austrian chemist Richard Max Victor Godeffroy (1847–1895) and his wife, the Hungarian pianist Adelheid Ottilie Augustine Godeffroy (née Hrdlicka, died 1920), who was born in Romania. After graduating from elementary school, she switched to the public school in Alsergrund, Vienna. She was baptized in the evangelical parish Augsburg Confession in Vienna. On 31 May 1928 she converted to Catholicism

== Stage career ==
She adopted "Durieux" as a stage name because her mother disapproved of her acting career. She trained as an actress in Vienna and made her debut at the Moravian Theatre in Olmütz (now Olomouc) in 1902. She then moved to Berlin where she worked with Max Reinhardt and with a group of expressionist artists around Kurt Hiller and Jakob van Hoddis. In 1903, she performed as Salome (in conjunction with Gertrud Eysoldt) in Oscar Wilde's play of the same name. The role brought Durieux great recognition, drawing the attention of well-known artists, including Auguste Renoir, Max Slevogt, Lovis Corinth, and Franz von Stuck, all of whom painted her portrait.

In 1911 Durieux entered the stage of the Lessing Theater where, on 1 November 1913, she became the second actress to perform the role Eliza Doolittle in a German language production of George Bernard Shaw's play Pygmalion, half a year before its English premiere on 11 April 1914. From 1915 she performed at the Royal Schauspielhaus Berlin. In 1923, Durieux appeared on Broadway in Dario Niccodemi's play The Shadow at the 39th Street Theatre.

== Marriages ==
In 1904, Durieux married the Berlin Secession painter Eugen Spiro, whose younger sister was Baladine Klossowska. They divorced consensually in 1905, after she had fallen in love with Paul Cassirer. She started dating the successful art dealer and editor and they got married in 1910. The marriage lasted 16 years, however Cassirer was very affected when Durieux wanted to divorce him. When their divorce was declared in 1926, Cassirer committed suicide in a room next to the court room where their hearing had taken place.

Soon after, Durieux married general director Ludwig Katzenellenbogen. In 1927 they were the main financiers of Erwin Piscator's Neues Schauspielhaus project. Durieux was a public character of 1920s Berlin and associated with numerous celebrities like the photographer Frieda Riess.

== Escape from Germany ==
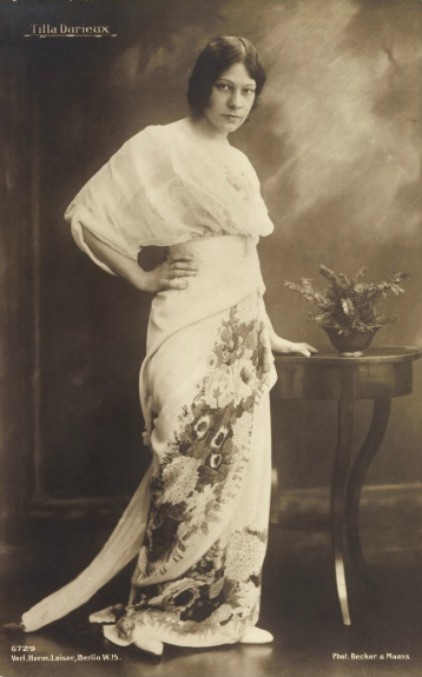
Tilla Durieux, c. 1915

In 1933, Durieux and Katzenellenbogen left Nazi Germany for Switzerland to escape Nazi rule. She continued to perform at the Vienna Theater in der Josefstadt and in Prague. In 1937 she moved to Zagreb, Croatia (then in the Kingdom of Yugoslavia) where she became a member of the International Red Aid. Durieux unsuccessfully tried to obtain visa for the United States. In 1941 Ludwig Katzenellenbogen was arrested by Gestapo agents in Thessaloniki and deported to Sachsenhausen concentration camp. He died in 1944 at Jüdisches Krankenhaus Berlin.

== Return and late years ==
Durieux managed to return to West Germany in 1952, appearing on stages in Berlin, Hamburg, and Münster. The plays in which she performed included A Dream Play by August Strindberg, The Chinese Wall by Max Frisch, and the Atriden-Tetralogie by Gerhart Hauptmann.

In 1971 Durieux underwent surgery for a hip fracture and died of post-operative sepsis. Although the date on her gravestone is 21 January 1971, she died on 21 of February 1971, which would have been the 100th birthday of Paul Cassirer.

== Art collection ==
Durieux's marriage to her second husband, Paul Cassirer, brought her into the world of art collecting. In addition to family portraits, the Tilla Durieux and Paul Cassirer Collection included modern works of art. When she and her third husband, Ludwig Katzenellenbogen, emigrated from Nazi Germany in 1933, they took some artworks with them.

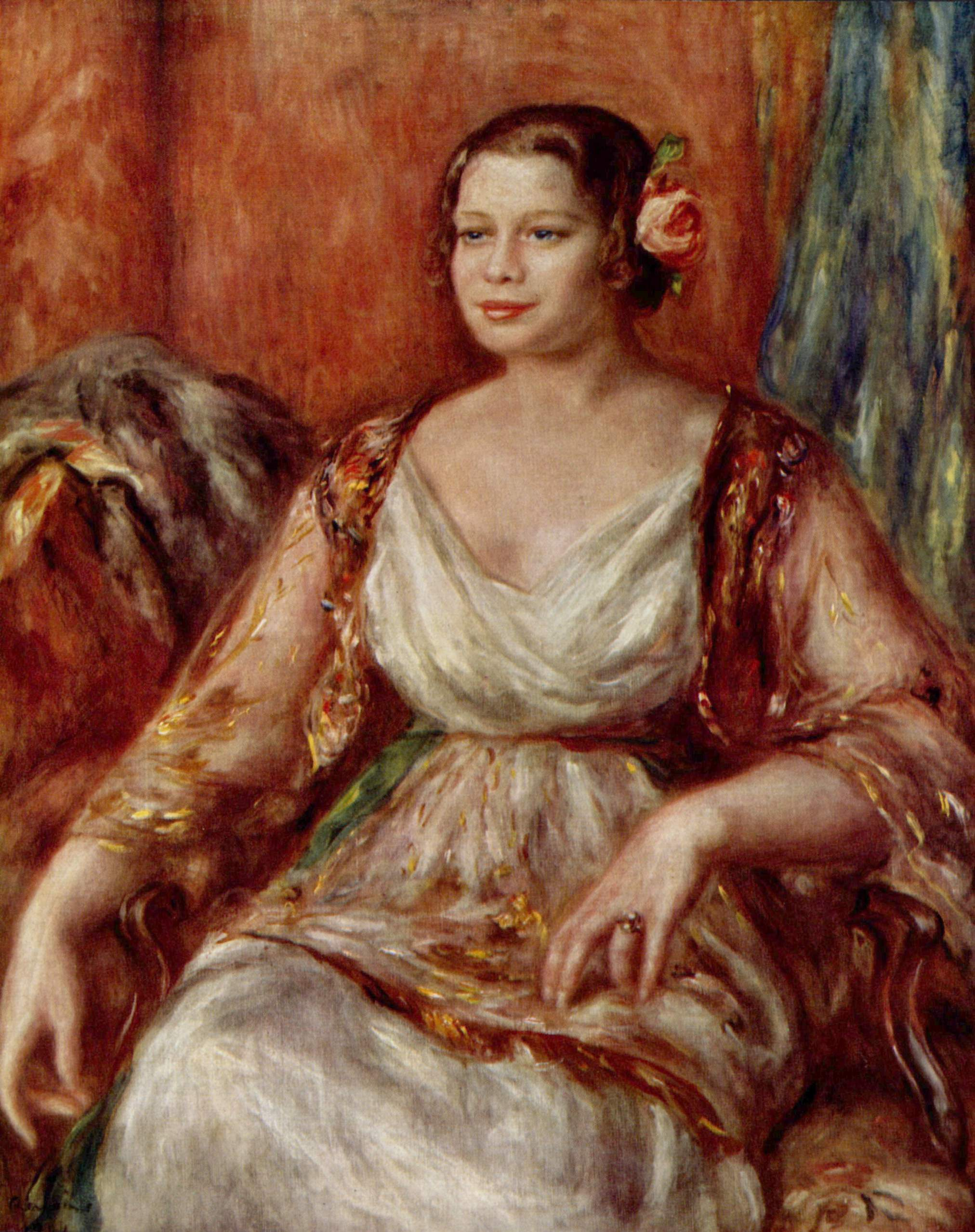
Portrait of Durieux (1914) by Renoir

Durieux’s collection was integrated into the Zlata Lubienski Art Collection. On November 13, 1945, the Commission for Gathering and Protecting of Cultural Monuments and Antiques proclaimed that the Zlata Lubienski Art Collection was a ‘protected’ collection under the Section for Museums of the Department of Art and Culture of the Ministry of Education of the Federal Republic of Croatia. Scholars have emphasized the ambiguous meaning of the word "protection". Lubienski and Durieux contested the decision but were denied.

On February 17, 1982, the City Institute for the Conservation of Cultural and Natural Heritage for the City Council in Zagreb gave a permit for the export of the Tilla Durieux Collection. A commission whose members included Ida Slade Šilović (City Institute for the Conservation of Cultural and Natural Heritage for the City Council in Zagreb), Zdenko Kuzmić and Zdenka Kazmar (City Museum in Zagreb), Dubravka Osrečki (Committee for Public Affairs) and Ljiljana Poljak (from City Administration) was established. The Tilla Durieux Collection was divided, leaving nineteen art works in Zagreb as a part of a new Tilla Durieux Collection at the City Museum in Zagreb while 58 items were exported to Germany, where many were sold.

The heirs of Ludwig Katzenellenbogen and his ex-wife Estella have listed fifty artworks with the Deutsches Zentrum Kulturgutverluste.

== Filmography ==
Year	Title	Role	Notes
1914	Der Flug in die Sonne	Helga Steinert	
1915	Die Launen einer Weltdame	Maud, leading role "lady of the world"	
1920	Die Verschleierte	leading role	
1921	Hashish, the Paradise of Hell	Sultanin	
1921	Der zeugende Tod	Boroka, Malerin	
1922	The Blood	screenplay by Tilla Durieux	
1929	Woman in the Moon	Fünf Gehirne und Scheckbücher	
1953	The Stronger Woman	Mutter der Fürstin	
1954	The Last Bridge	Mara	
1956	The Story of Anastasia	Zarenmutter Maria Feodorowna von Russland	
1957	Von allen geliebt	Frau Avenarius	
1957	El Hakim	Mutter des Hussni	
1958	Resurrection	Die Alte	
1959	Labyrinth	Schwester Celestine	
1959	Morgen wirst du um mich weinen	Tante Ermelin	
1961	Barbara	Armgart	
1964	Condemned to Sin	Die Großmutter	
1966	It	Die Alte aus dem Osten	

== See also ==
- The Holocaust in the Independent State of Croatia
