= Si Lewen =

Polish-American painter (1918–2016)

- Lewen in 1952
- Born: 8 November 1918; Lubin, Poland
- Died: 25 July 2016 (aged 97); Gwynedd, Pennsylvania, U.S.

Si Lewen (8 November 1918 – 25 July 2016) was a Polish-American painter and member of the Ritchie Boys, a unit of the United States Army during World War II.

== Biography ==
Lewen was born into a Polish-Jewish family on 8 November 1918, in Lubin, Poland. His family moved to Berlin in 1920, where Lewen received drawing lessons from Max Adron, a pupil of Paul Klee and the Bauhaus, and Klaus Richter, of the Berlin University of the Arts.

After Adolf Hitler came to power in 1933, Lewen and his older brother emigrated to France to prepare for the departure of the entire family to Palestine. In 1935, when Lewen was 17, the family unexpectedly received visas to the United States. There, in New York City, Lewen attended the National Academy of Design and the Art Students League.

Despite his tendency towards pacifism, Lewen volunteered for the United States Army in 1942. Shortly after enlisting, he married his wife, Rennie, whom he had met in 1938. Because of his knowledge of German, he then became a member of the Ritchie Boys. He took part in the European campaigns from Normandy to Germany, which brought him to the Buchenwald Concentration Camp.

After the war, Si and Rennie moved to Kew Garden, Queens, where they had two children between 1947 and 1949. His traumatic experiences and mental breakdown at Buchenwald during the war inspired his drawings created in 1950 and published in 1957 under the title, The Parade: A Story in 55 Drawings.

Lewen began teaching art at Cooper Union and the New School. In 1968, the family moved to New Paltz, New York. Lewen continued to teach at the New School until 1980, commuting weekly into the city.

In 2005, struggling to support Rennie's dementia, Lewen and Rennie moved to an assisted living facility in Pennsylvania. Rennie died on 12 February 2015, and Lewen moved to new quarters. Lewen died on 25 July 2016 at the Foulkeways retirement home in Gwynedd, Pennsylvania.

== Legacy ==
Lewen was praised by Albert Einstein, who, in a 1951 letter, described Lewen's work as "very impressive" and highlighted the political power of his art.

He was featured prominently in The Ritchie Boys, a 2004 documentary by Christian Bauer that was shortlisted for an Oscar in 2005.

In 2016, Art Spiegelman, author of Maus, published Lewen's Parade: An Artist's Odyssey, an "expanded 'director's cut' version of Lewen's earlier publication".

In 2026, the Metropolitan Museum of Art exhibited There Are No Words: Si Lewen's Parade, the first display of Lewen's works since the museum acquired them in 2024. Max Hollein, the museum's director, described the Parade as "uniquely moving, enormously relevant, and extraordinarily engaging" and an important acquisition for the museum.
