= Konrad Kellen =

American political scientist

Konrad Kellen (born Konrad Moritz Adolf Katzenellenbogen; December 14, 1913 – April 8, 2007) was a German-born American political scientist, intelligence analyst, and author.

Konrad Kellen.

At different points in his career, Kellen analyzed postwar German soldiers, defectors from behind the Iron Curtain, Viet Cong who had been captured, and terrorists. He was among the first intelligence analysts to conclude that, contrary to prevailing U.S. administration assessments, enemy morale in the Vietnam War was, in fact high and the war was not winnable. While at the RAND Corporation, he co-authored an open letter to the U.S. government urging withdrawal of troops.

== Early life ==
Kellen was a member of a prominent Jewish family in Berlin, the son of Ludwig Katzenellenbogen. He was a distant relative of Albert Einstein and a cousin of economist Albert Otto Hirschman. He studied law in Munich before fleeing Germany with his family in March 1933 at age 19 to escape Nazi persecution. After living in France, the Netherlands, and Yugoslavia, Kellen traveled to the United States. He arrived in New York in 1935 and moved to Los Angeles, becoming an American citizen under the name Konrad Kellen. From 1941-1943, Kellen was the private secretary to author Thomas Mann.

== Career ==
During World War II, Kellen trained at Camp Ritchie where he trained to become one of the Ritchie Boys. In the U.S. Army, he served as an intelligence NCO with 2nd Mobile Radio Broadcasting Company in Europe, specializing in psychological warfare, and being awarded the Legion of Merit. After the war, Kellen remained in Germany as a political intelligence officer with the occupation forces as part of the denazification initiative, his duties including interviewing German soldiers to find out why they kept fighting for Hitler long after it was clear that their war was lost. Kellen also worked for Radio Free Europe, interviewing defectors from behind the Iron Curtain to study life under the Soviet regime.

In 1945, a stranger, who turned out to be painter Marc Chagall's daughter, approached Kellen in a Paris café and asked him to help save a stack of her father's canvases from the chaos of postwar Europe by bringing them to the United States, which he ultimately agreed to do. That significant challenge took Kellen over a month to accomplish. For his compensation, he received one of the Chagall paintings, which he sold in the 1950s.

In the early 1960s, he worked at the Hudson Institute think tank with military strategist and futurist Herman Kahn. In the mid 1960s, Kellen joined the RAND Corporation. He was among the first to conclude, in 1965, that the Vietnam War was unwinnable. His opinion diverged markedly from the U.S. Administration's optimistic view, based in part on assessments by analyst Leon Gouré, that the war was winnable because of low enemy morale, Kellen joined RAND colleagues in writing an open letter to the U.S. government recommending the withdrawal of troops. In a 1971 analysis, Kellen disagreed with many other observers and concluded that "nothing seems more unlikely" than that the communists would strike in a big way once the US forces were down to 200 thousand or less. Contrary to his forecast, the communists launched the bigger than ever Easter Offensive in South-Vietnam in March 1972. In 1972, months before the U.S. pullout pursuant to the Paris Peace Accords, investigative journalist Jack Anderson cited the open letter authored by Kellen as authority for the assertion that communist military morale in Vietnam was high.

Kellen went on to become an analyst of terrorism, his reports from the late 1970s and early 1980s identifying trends in terrorism that manifested a decade later.

Kellen wrote research papers and newspaper commentaries, as well as books including the biography Khrushchev (1961) and The Coming Age of Woman Power (1972), a study of male-female relationships. In 2003 he published his autobiography, Katzenellenbogen, named after his original family name. He lived in retirement in Los Angeles, dying at his home in Pacific Palisades.

Terrorism expert Brian Jenkins said Kellen often took a contrarian or independent view among RAND Corporation colleagues. In 2013, six years after Kellen's death, journalist and author Malcolm Gladwell noted Kellen's life and career were based on his ability to listen, citing him as "a truly great listener" for his ability to listen without filtering what he heard through the biases of the times.
