= Fort Ritchie =

Former American military installation

Fort Ritchie eponym: Albert Ritchie
- Part of United States Army
- Washington County, Maryland
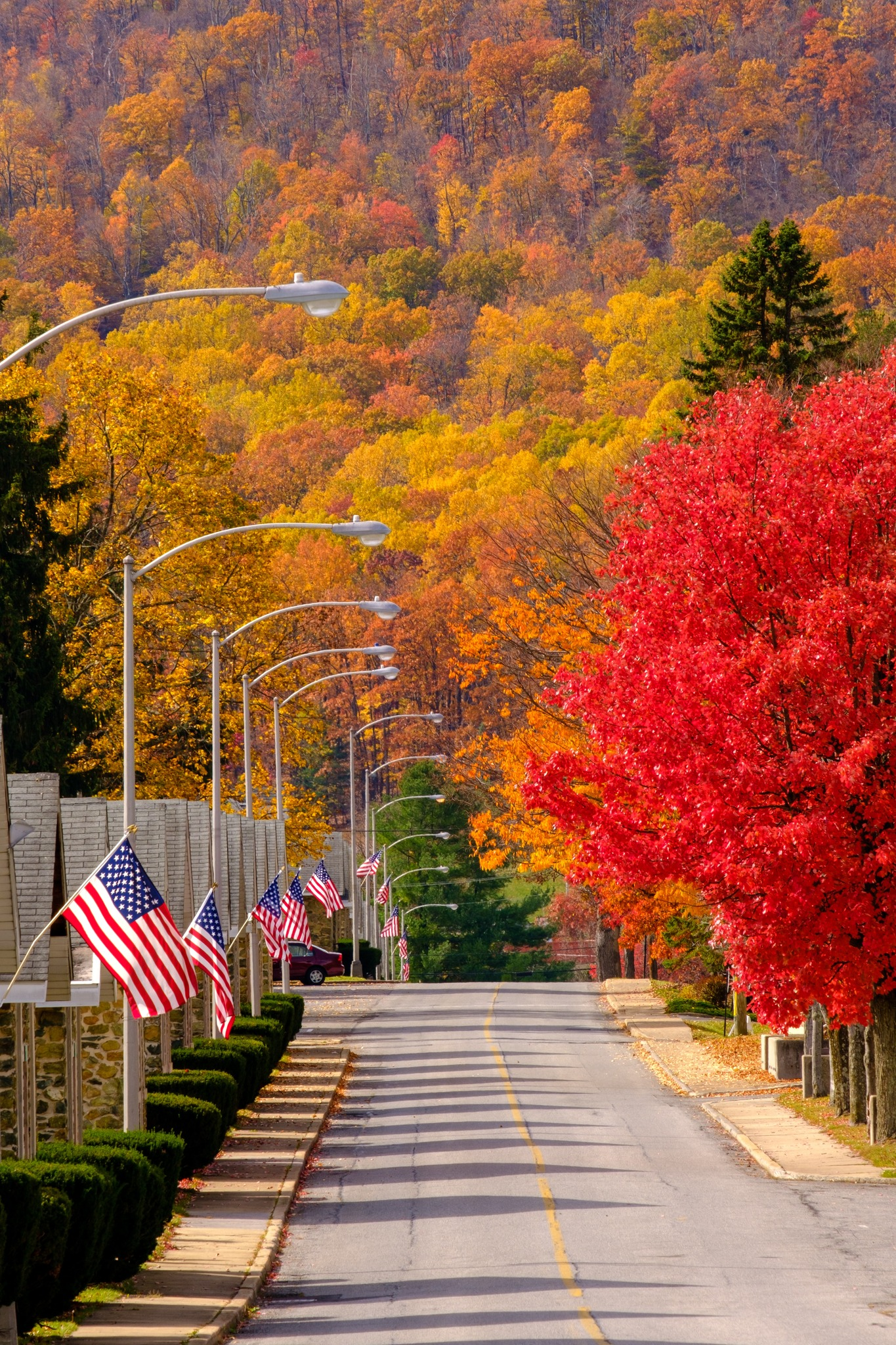
- Finger Buildings on Barrick Avenue

Location
- Coordinates: 39°42′19.1″N 77°29′45.6″W

Site history
- In use: 1926–1998
- Battles/wars: World War II, Cold War

Garrison information
- Past commanders: Col. George V. Sotton Nov 51 – May 53; Col. Maurice C. Higgins May 53 – Oct 55; Lt. Col. Roy W. Lonsinger Oct 55 – Jan 56; Col. James J. Winn Jan 56 – Jun 59; Col. Percy H. Lash Jul 59 – Jul 61; Col. David B. Nye Aug 61 – Apr 64; Col. Harry W Barry ay 64 – Jun 65; Col. George W. Rhyne June 65 – Apr 68; Col. Otis Koch May 68 – Nov 68; Col. Thomas W. Riley Jr. Dec 68 – Aug 69; Col. Robert E. Dunlap Oct 69 – Jul 72; Col. Herman Ertlschweiger Jul 72 – Nov 73; Col. James A Manning Nov 73 – Aug 74; Col. Harold G. DeMoya Aug 74 – Jun 76; Col. Daniel F Schungel Aug 76 – Aug 78; Col. William B. Brumley Oct 78 – Apr 80; Col. Dan S. Leonard Apr 80 – Mar 81; Col. Raymond E. Burrell Apr 81 – Nov 82; Col. Herbert N. Meininger Nov 82 – Jul 84; Col. Carroll M. Fyffe Jul 84 – Jun 88; Col. Thomas B Edwards June 88 – Oct 90; Col. Mark A Scureman Oct 90 – Aug 92; Lt. Col. Robert J Boehman Aug 92 – Jan 93; Lt. Col. Robert M. Butt Jun 93 – Jul 95; Lt. Col. James A LaFleur Jul 95 – Jun 97; Lt. Col Francis D. Clepper Jr. Jun 97 – Sep 98

Fort Ritchie in Cascade, Maryland, was a military installation southwest of Blue Ridge Summit, Pennsylvania, and southeast of Waynesboro in the area of South Mountain. Following the 1995 Base Realignment and Closure Commission, it closed in 1998.

== History ==
=== Buena Vista Ice Company ===
About 1889, the Buena Vista Ice Company of Philadelphia purchased 400 acres of the land on which most of Fort Ritchie now stands. The company planned to cut natural ice from a manmade lake and ship it to Baltimore, Washington, and southern markets via the Western Maryland Railroad's Baltimore-Hagerstown line. The first lake was created in approximately 1901 and named Lake Royer (the "Lower Lake").

A railroad spur off the Western Maryland line was built alongside the southeastern shore of Lake Royer. Unfortunately, the locomotives' exhaust laid soot on the ice in the lake, so a second lake (the "Upper Lake") was constructed far enough away from the track so that the ice would remain clean for cutting. Lake Royer also served as a recreational spot during the summer tourist season. Demand for natural ice declined over the years, and the Buena Vista Ice Company discontinued operations at the site.

=== Maryland National Guard ===
In 1926, the Maryland National Guard investigated several locations in searching for a new summer training camp. A decision in favor of the ice company property was primarily based upon its proximity to the Western Maryland Railroad and the telegraph line. The property also was attractive to Adjutant General Milton Reckord because its altitude and position in the Blue Ridge Mountains could ward off hot summer temperatures and mosquitoes, unlike other areas of the state. The Camp was named after popular Maryland Governor Albert Ritchie. The site was controlled by the Maryland National Guard from 1926 to 1942 and then again from 1946 to 1951.

=== Camp Ritchie ===
Camp Ritchie was the site of prisoner of war (POW) camps during 1942–1947, all information available housing mostly German Africa Korps officers and Italians captured during Operation Torch.

The US Army activated the Military Intelligence Training Center (MITC) on June 19, 1942, and trained 19,600 intelligence troops, including the Ritchie Boys, approximately 15,200 servicemen, most with high fluency in multiple European languages, for frontlines interrogation, battle-field intelligence, investigation, counter-intelligence, and related work. Approximately 14%, or 2,200, of them were Jewish refugees born in Germany and Austria, alongside American Jewish servicemen, among others. The 'Ritchie Boys' were later involved in the Nuremberg trials as prosecutors and translators.

Nisei women joined the Military Intelligence Service as translators and interrogators and attended a rigorous six-month study course designed to educate women on the Japanese military language. Upon graduation, most of the women were assigned to the Pacific Military Intelligence Research Section at Camp Ritchie, Maryland, and worked with Japanese documents to uncover military plans. Japanese-Americans also served as translators at this site. One, a male Buddhist Japanese-American from Hawaii, Yoshiaki Fujitani, served in military intelligence in Camp Ritchie during the war.

Naval Unit, Air Technical Document Research Unit, Camp Ritchie, Maryland was a United States Navy shore activity during World War II. 3rd Mobile Radio Broadcast Company activated December 29, 1943, at Camp Ritchie.

Following the War, Camp Ritchie was involved with yet another top secret effort known as 'The Hill Project' in which German POWs were responsible for working directly with Allied forces to conduct research on "subjects which will aid in preserving military security in Europe" and "prosecuting the war against Japan" (a goal which proved to be unnecessary following their surrender); additional research was conducted in "improving intelligence organization and techniques and to other selected matters on which important lessons can be gained from studying German methods in detail". While only 150 POWs worked directly on the Hill Project, many of those were previously high-ranking Wehrmacht officers. It is estimated that by March 1946, over 1500 POWs were at Ritchie; many of them had been involved in some way with the Hill Project.

In 1946, control of Camp Ritchie was returned to the state government. From 1946 to 1950, Camp Ritchie served as a chronic disease center for the state of Maryland. The repurchase of Camp Ritchie by the United States Army took place in 1948 for what would be called the Alternate Joint Communication Center, Site R. Camp Ritchie was then designated as Fort Ritchie, and from 1964 to 1975, the Army used it as a support base and to engineer, install, and test information systems equipment and communication units.

=== Closure ===
Support for Raven Rock Mountain Complex transferred to Fort Detrick on October 1, 1997. Fort Ritchie closed in 1998 under the 1995 Base Realignment and Closure Commission. The property was sold to Corporate Office Properties Trust (COPT) for mixed-use development. As the 2007 recession pressed on, PenMar Development Corporation took back ownership of the property in 2012. Fort Ritchie housed a military preparatory academy under the direction of Dr. Robert Alexander; National Role Models Academy, also known as "College Corps", 2000–02.

After that, the PenMar board worked to have Fort Ritchie designated as a "sustainable community" by the State of Maryland, which would have qualified the property for tax advantages and grants. The property had been cleaned up and a new project manager was hired to market the property in an effort to bring back some of the jobs lost when the Army departed. Several alternative uses for the property were being explored which would have created a mix of uses that were to have included residential, commercial, recreational, and some office/light industrial uses.

Ultimately, PenMar fell into financial ruin and the grounds were returned to the Washington County government which generally viewed the site as a financial loss. In an attempt to stop the monetary hemorrhaging, several members of the Washington County government travelled to South Korea in connection with a contractor called JGBLI which secured approximately 60 acres of ground on the opposing side of Lake Royer for development. The manner in which that land was transferred was highly controversial, with many residents and politicians citing violations of Maryland's public meeting laws. Many Cascade residents who had lived on the site for decades were forced to move despite the fact that their homes were not directly affected by the sale. After many failed attempts to come to an agreement on how the premises would be developed, JGBLI backed out of the total purchase of Fort Ritchie. Subsequent to this, several individuals came forward in an attempt to secure the grounds for themselves, including a vineyard owner from Potomac, Maryland, and the Maryland Department of Natural Resources. In 2020 Fort Ritchie was planned to be sold to John Krumpotich, a local resident, for the cost of 1.85 million dollars. Krumpotich had made statements to the effect that he would like to preserve most of the Fort while making some of the property mixed use development in order to breathe life back into the quiet mountain town.

In March 2020, a lawsuit was filed against the county government and Krumpotich by a property investor from Frederick County, Maryland. A court ruled in favor of Krumpotich and the county; however, an appeal was filed. As of June 30, 2020, the transfer of the property to Krumpotich had been further delayed due to an appeal. According to a news article in local newspaper The Herald-Mail, "A Washington County official said Tuesday that resolving litigation affecting the sale of the former Fort Ritchie Army base should be wrapped up within a year, possibly sooner."

=== Trees of Fort Ritchie ===
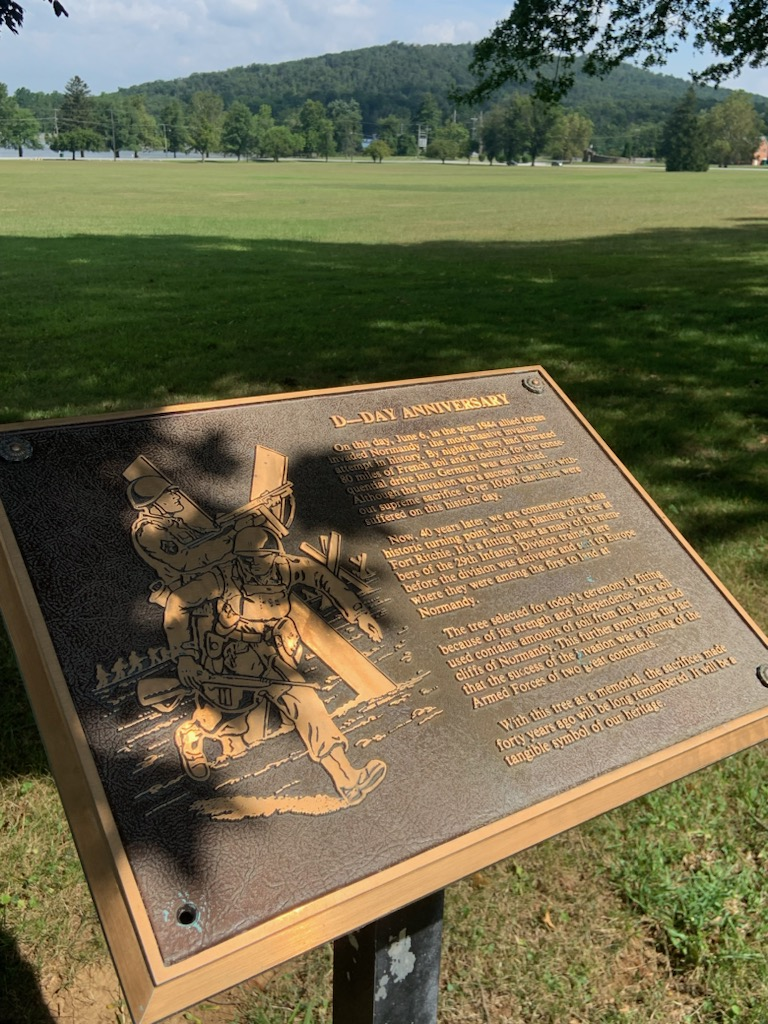

There is a special maple tree at Fort Ritchie standing by the parade field. The plaque by the tree reads:

"D-DAY ANNIVERSARY On this day, June 6, in the year 1944 allied forces invaded Normandy - the most massive invasion attempted in history. By nightfall, they had liberated 80 miles of French soil and a toehold for the consequential drive into Germany was established. Although the invasion was a success, it was not without supreme sacrifice. Over 10,000 casualties were suffered on that historic day. Now, 40 years later, there is commenmoration at this historic turning point with the planting of a tree at Fort Ritchie. It is a fitting place as many of the members of the 29th Infantry Division trained here before the division was activated and sent to Europe where they were among the first to land at Normandy. The tree selected for today's ceremony is fitting because of its strength and independence. The soil used contains amounts of soil from the beaches and cliffs of Normandy. This further symbolizes the fact that the success of the invasion was a joining of the Armed Forces of two great continents. With this tree as a memorial, the sacrifices made forty years ago will be long remembered. It will be tangible symbol of our heritage."

=== Revival ===
On April 7, 2021, John Krumpotich became the owner of Fort Ritchie and has expressed his plans to revive Ritchie and the Cascade community by bringing businesses, historic preservation, and housing to the former 500+/- acre army post. Krumpotich has stated that it is a "paramount priority" to rehabilitate the stone structures on site to maintain its historic integrity while bringing each building back to life. Following the sale of the property, Fort Ritchie, under the leadership of the Ritchie Revival team, has opened two manufacturing facilities, a taproom, an art gallery, a primary care facility, a cafe, ice cream shop, and museum. The revival has also spurred a number of successes including a $15,000,000 tax credit from the state of Maryland.

== See also ==
- Ritchie Boys
- Raven Rock Mountain Complex
