= Deaths in October 2002 =

The following is a list of notable deaths in October 2002.

Entries for each day are listed alphabetically by surname. A typical entry lists information in the following sequence:

- Name, age, country of citizenship at birth, subsequent country of citizenship (if applicable), reason for notability, cause of death (if known), and reference.

== October 2002 ==
=== 1 ===
- Walter Annenberg, 94, American publisher (The Philadelphia Inquirer, TV Guide, Daily Racing Form, Seventeen) and philanthropist.
- Ilie Ceaușescu, 76, Romanian general and communist politician, pneumonia.
- Consuelo Salgar, 74, Colombian journalist, advertising executive, and politician, liver cancer.
- Edeltraud Schramm, 78, Austrian Olympic gymnast (1948, 1952).

=== 2 ===
- Norman O. Brown, 89, American philosopher and author (Life Against Death, Love's Body).
- Al Lerner, 69, American businessman, football team owner, and philanthropist.
- William Logan, 87, American Olympic cyclist (1936).
- Tiberiu Olah, 74, Romanian-Hungarian composer, teacher and musicologist.
- Alexander Sinclair, 91, Canadian ice hockey player and Olympian (1936).
- Heinz von Foerster, 90, Austrian-American physicist and philosopher, one of the founders of constructivism.

=== 3 ===
- Tad Horino, 81, American film and television actor.
- Felix Kracht, 90, German engineer.
- Bruce Paltrow, 58, American television and film director and producer, pneumonia.
- Dalvanius Prime, 54, New Zealand entertainer and songwriter, cancer.
- John Weitz, 79, American fashion designer, novelist and historian.

=== 4 ===
- Per Bronken, 67, Norwegian poet, novelist, actor, film director and stage producer.
- Alphonse Chapanis, 85, American pioneer in the field of industrial design.
- André Delvaux, 76, Belgian film director, considered the father of the Belgian film industry, heart attack.
- Hans Holmér, 71, Swedish civil servant and author.
- Buddy Lester, 87, American actor and comedian, cancer.
- Ahmad Mahmoud, 70, Iranian novelist.
- Russ Ochsenhirt, 90, American basketball player.
- Marcel Reymond, 91, Swiss Olympic ski jumper (1936).
- Arnaldo Salvi, 86, Italian footballer.
- Roy Wilkins, 68, American professional football player (University of Georgia, Los Angeles Rams, Washington Redskins).

=== 5 ===
- Magda B. Arnold, 98, Canadian psychologist.
- Reginald Hibbert, 80, British diplomat.
- Morag Hood, 59, British actress, cancer.
- Ron Horn, 64, American basketball player.
- Tony Mazzocchi, 76, American labor leader, pancreatic cancer.
- Mia Čorak Slavenska, 86, Croatian-American ballerina.
- Jay R. Smith, 87, American child actor and comedian, stabbed.

=== 6 ===
- Ben Eastman, 91, American Olympic runner (1932).
- Wolfgang Mischnick, 81, German liberal politician (FDP).
- Prince Claus of the Netherlands, 76, husband of Queen Beatrix of the Netherlands and Dutch diplomat, pneumonia.
- Chuck Rayner, 82, Canadian professional hockey player (New York Americans, New York Rangers).
- Nick Whitehead, 69, British (Welsh) sprinter and Olympian (bronze medal in 1960).
- Juan Yustrich, 93, Argentine football goalkeeper.

=== 7 ===
- Pierangelo Bertoli, 59, Italian singer-songwriter and poet, heart attack.
- Ralph Harry, 85, Australian diplomat and intelligence specialist.
- Cor Kint, 82, Dutch backstroke swimmer and 1938 European Champion.
- Thomas Mack, 88, American rower and Olympian (1928, 1932).
- Marcel Paille, 69, Canadian ice hockey goaltender (New York Rangers), cancer.
- Domenico Paolella, 86, Italian director, screenwriter and journalist.
- Ed Rossbach, 88, American fiber artist.
- Amanda Zhao, 21, Chinese student.

=== 8 ===
- Jodie Beeler, 80, American baseball player (Cincinnati Reds).
- Phyllis Calvert, 87, British actress (The Man in Grey, Fanny by Gaslight, The Magic Bow, My Own True Love), kidney failure.
- Kirk Grybowski, 64, US Virgin Islands Olympic sailor (1984).
- Jacques Richard, 50, Canadian ice hockey player (Atlanta Flames, Buffalo Sabres, Quebec Nordiques), car accident.
- Joachim Zahn, 88, German business executive, chairman of Daimler-Benz (1971-1979).

=== 9 ===
- Fred Arndt, 85, American basketball player.
- Sopubek Begaliev, 71, Soviet-Kyrgyz economist and politician.
- Charles Guggenheim, 78, American documentary film director, producer, and screenwriter, pancreatic cancer.
- Anwar Hussain, 82, Pakistani cricketer.
- Oleksandr Liashko, 86, Ukrainian politician.
- Carlo Lievore, 64, Italian Olympic javelin thrower (1960, 1964).
- Eric Martin, 33, American racing driver, racing accident.
- Jim Martin, 78, American football player.
- Bruno O'Ya, 69, Estonian-Polish actor.
- Aileen Wuornos, 46, American serial killer, execution by lethal injection.

=== 10 ===
- Strahinja Alagić, 78, Serbian basketball player and coach.
- Allison Calder, 42, New Zealand swimmer and Olympian (1976).
- Mario de las Casas, 101, Peruvian football defender.
- Tom Casey, 78, American professional football player (New York Yankees, Hamilton Wildcats, Winnipeg Blue Bombers).
- Fate Echols, 63, American professional football player (Northwestern University, St. Louis Cardinals).
- Lawrence H. Fountain, 89, American politician (U.S. Representative for North Carolina's 2nd congressional district).
- Teresa Graves, 54, American actress and singer, house fire, accidental death.
- Denison Kitchel, 94, American lawyer political advisor.
- Abe Most, 82, Swing clarinetist and alto saxophonist.
- Zara Nelsova, 81, Canadian cellist.
- Tom Sullivan, 52, American gridiron football player (Philadelphia Eagles, Cleveland Browns), accidental death.
- Erling Sørensen, 81, Danish football player, manager, and Olympian (1948).
- Joe Wood, 86, American baseball player (Boston Red Sox).

=== 11 ===
- Betty Molesworth Allen, 89, New Zealand botanist.
- Stewart Crawford, 89, British diplomat.
- Werner Eberlein, 82, German socialist politician and party functionary, heart attack.
- Toots Ferrell, 73, American baseball player.
- Bill Field, 93, British politician.
- Ron Gray, 82, English football player and manager.
- Fritz Halmen, 90, Romanian Olympic handball player (1936).
- Maxim Levy, 52, Israeli politician.
- Dina Pathak, 80, Indian actor and director, heart attack.
- Emilio García Riera, 70, Spanish-born Mexican actor, writer and cinema critic.
- Christine Stevens, 84, American animal welfare activist and conservationist.
- Fred Troller, 71, Swiss-born graphic designer.
- Stanley Wagner, 94, Canadian ice hockey player and Olympian (1932).
- Rusty Wailes, 66, American Olympic rower (1956, 1960).

=== 12 ===
- Viktor Asmaev, 54, Russian Olympic equestrian (1980).
- Ray Conniff, 85, American bandleader and arranger, fall.
- Carolina Fadic, 28, Chilean actress and television presenter, cerebral hemorrhage.
- Desmond Fitzpatrick, 89, British Army general.
- Audrey Mestre, 28, French world record-setting free diver, drowned.
- Nozomi Momoi, 24, Japanese AV idol, murdered.
- Sidney W. Pink, 86, American movie director and producer.
- William R. Sears, 89, American aeronautical engineer and educator.
- Mick Shoebottom, 58, English rugby league footballer.

=== 13 ===
- Stephen E. Ambrose, 66, American historian and author (Band of Brothers), lung cancer.
- Keene Curtis, 79, American actor (The Rothschilds, Annie, Cheers), Alzheimer's disease.
- Mason Hammond, 99, American educator and scholar.
- Jim Higgins, 71, British politician.
- Billy McAdams, 68, Northern Irish football player and manager.
- Ila Mitra, 76, Indian communist politician and activist.
- Dennis Patrick, 84, American actor, fire.
- Eileen Southern, 82, American musicologist, researcher and author.
- Sir Garfield Todd, 94, Prime Minister of Southern Rhodesia.
- Herman Fredrik Zeiner-Gundersen, 87, Norwegian Army general.

=== 14 ===
- Bill Green, 72, American politician (U.S. Representative for New York's 18th and 15th congressional districts), liver cancer.
- Louis Pichon, 86, French Olympic modern pentathlete (1948).
- Timothy Reuter, 55, German-British historian, brain cancer.
- Seikyu Ri, 91, Korean Olympic basketball player (1936).
- Norbert Schultze, 91, German film score composer and Nazi Party member.
- Arturo Silvestri, 81, Italian football player and manager.
- Rostyslav Svanidze, 30, Ukrainian swimmer and Olympian (1996, 2000).

=== 15 ===
- Grace Hamblin, 94, British private secretary to Winston Churchill.
- Jack Lee, 89, British film director.
- Paul Paillole, 96, French intelligence services officer.
- Toivo Räsänen, 77, Finnish Olympic rower (1952).
- Zeev, 79, Israeli caricaturist and illustrator.

=== 16 ===
- Per Bak, 53, Danish theoretical physicist, known for "self-organized criticality", myelodysplastic syndrome.
- Philip Brett, 64, British-American musicologist, musician and conductor, cancer.
- Harry Ferrier, 82, Scottish football player and manager.
- Allen Walker Read, 96, American etymologist and lexicographer.
- Henri Renaud, 77, French jazz pianist, record producer, and record company executive.

=== 17 ===
- Derek Bell, 66, Northern Irish musician and composer (The Chieftains), heart attack.
- Pattie Coldwell, 50, British television broadcaster and journalist (Nationwide, Open Air, Loose Women, You and Yours), brain tumor.
- Yara Cortes, 81, Brazilian actress.
- Chuck Domanico, 58, American jazz bassist, lung cancer.
- D. Elmo Hardy, 88, American entomologist.
- Bashful Brother Oswald, 90, American country musician, a frequent Grand Ole Opry performer.
- Yitzhak Peretz, 66, Israeli politician.
- Alina Pienkowska, 50, Polish free trade union activist and politician, cancer.
- Aileen Riggin, 96, American Olympic swimmer and diver (1920, 1924).
- Fred Scolari, 80, American basketball player and coach.

=== 18 ===
- Richard Bernstein, 62, American artist, member of the circle of Andy Warhol, complications of AIDS.
- Cecil Blacker, 86, British Army general, Adjutant-General to the Forces.
- Kam Fong Chun, 84, American police officer and actor (Hawaii Five-O), lung cancer.
- John D. Ferry, 90, Canadian-American biochemist, made important contributions to polymer science.
- Roman Tam, 57, Hong Kong cantopop singer, liver cancer.
- Miroslav Vymazal, 50, Czech Olympic cyclist (1976).

=== 19 ===
- Peter Bergmann, 87, German-American physicist, known for his work with Albert Einstein.
- Manuel Álvarez Bravo, 100, Mexican photographer.
- John Meredyth Lucas, 83, American writer, director and producer, leukemia.
- Mehli Mehta, 94, Indian conductor and violinist.
- Hans Jürgen Press, 76, German children's writer and illustrator.
- Nikolay Rukavishnikov, 70, Soviet cosmonaut (Soyuz 10, Soyuz 16, Soyuz 33), heart attack.
- Hank Smith, 68, Canadian country music singer.
- Héctor Trujillo, 94, Dominican general and political figure.

=== 20 ===
- Barbara Berjer, 82, American actress (As the World Turns, Another World), pneumonia.
- Les Douglas, 83, Canadian ice hockey player (Detroit Red Wings).
- Hans Eisele, 62, German football player.
- Bernard Fresson, 71, French actor (French Connection II, The Tenant, Street of No Return), cancer.
- Mel Harder, 93, American baseball player, coach, and manager (Cleveland Indians).

=== 21 ===
- Aldo Canazza, 94, Italian racing cyclist.
- Alejandro Díaz, 77, Cuban Olympic gymnast (1948).
- Bernardino Pérez Elizarán, 77, Spanish football player and manager.
- Manfred Ewald, 76, East German Olympic committee president, pneumonia.
- Jesse L. Greenstein, 93, American astronomer.
- George Hall, 85, Canadian theatre, television, and film actor.
- Kemal Kurt, 54, Turkish-German author, translator and photographer.
- Bernhard Neumann, 93, British-Australian mathematician.
- Kaisa Parviainen, 87, Finnish Olympic athlete (1948, 1952).
- Marquita Rivera, 80, Puerto Rican actress, singer and dancer, stroke.
- Ed Ryan, 76, American football player (Pittsburgh Steelers).
- Beatrice Serota, Baroness Serota, 83, British politician.
- Harbhajan Singh, 82, Indian poet, critic, and cultural commentator.
- Y. R. Swamy, Indian film director and screenwriter.

=== 22 ===
- Queen Geraldine of Albania, 87, Queen consort of King Zog I of Albania.
- George Bellak, 83, American television writer.
- Marian Bergeron, 84, American beauty pageant winner (Miss America 1933) and big band singer, leukemia.
- Anna Cattaneo, 91, Italian Olympic figure skater (1936).
- Igor Irodov, 78, Soviet Russian physicist and World War II veteran.
- Robert Nixon, 63, British cartoonist.

=== 23 ===
- Lucille Carroll, 96, American Broadway actress and MGM studio executive.
- Adolph Green, 87, American lyricist and playwright.
- Nathan Görling, 97, Swedish composer of film scores.
- Richard Helms, 89, American diplomat and CIA director, multiple myeloma.
- Marianne Hoppe, 93, German theatre and film actress.
- Nathan H. Juran, 95, Austrian-American film and television director.
- David Lewis, 85, New Zealand sailor and adventurer.
- Elizabeth Pakenham, Countess of Longford, 96, British historian.
- Janos Nyiri, 69, Hungarian-British theatre director, journalist and writer, cancer.
- Danijel Popović, 20, Croatian football player, traffic collision.
- Beulah Quo, 79, Chinese-American actress and activist.

=== 24 ===
- Winton M. Blount, 81, American public servant, business executive and philanthropist.
- Ralph Budelman, 84, American water polo player and Olympian (1948).
- Hernando Casanova, 57, Colombian actor, director, singer, and presenter, heart attack.
- Hernán Gaviria, 32, Colombian football player and Olympian (1992), lightning strike.
- Harry Hay, 90, American gay rights activist and Mattachine Society founder, lung cancer.
- Roy Hord Jr., 67, American football player (Los Angeles Rams, Philadelphia Eagles, New York Jets).
- Jose Sebastian Laboa, 79, Spanish prelate of the Catholic Church.
- Charmian May, 65, English actress (You're Only Young Twice, Weirdsister College, Bridget Jones's Diary), cancer.
- Peggy Moran, 84, American film actress, complications from a car accident.
- Scott Plank, 43, American actor, traffic collision.
- José Antonio Rodríguez Vega, 44, Spanish serial killer and rapist, stabbed.
- Lotte Tarp, 57, Danish actress, lung cancer.

=== 25 ===
- Ian Russell, 13th Duke of Bedford, 85, British peer and writer.
- Micheline Cheirel, 85, French actress.
- Herbert Duffus, 94, Jamaican politician and judge.
- Richard Harris, 72, Irish actor (Camelot, Harry Potter and the Philosopher's Stone, This Sporting Life), Hodgkin lymphoma.
- Kōki Ishii, 61, Japanese politician, stab wound.
- Fritz Kominek, 75, Austrian footballer and manager.
- Mike Lind, 62, American football player (San Francisco 49ers, Pittsburgh Steelers).
- Ernest Mancoba, 98, South African avant-garde artist.
- Doug McGibbon, 83, English football player.
- Rainbeaux Smith, 47, American actress and musician, hepatitis.
- René Thom, 79, French mathematician.
- Paul Wellstone, 58, American professor, author, and U.S. Senator from Minnesota (since 1991), plane crash.
- Sheila Wellstone, 58, American politician, plane crash.

=== 26 ===
- Movsar Barayev, 23, Chechen Islamist militia leader, killed during the Moscow theater hostage crisis.
- Zura Barayeva, Chechen Islamist, killed during the Moscow theater hostage crisis.
- Jacques Massu, 94, French general.
- Stuart Townend, 93, British military officer, athlete, and politician.

=== 27 ===
- Giovanni Córdoba, 24, Colombian footballer.
- André de Toth, 89, Hungarian-American film director (The Gunfighter, House of Wax, The Indian Fighter), aneurysm.
- Tom Dowd, 77, American recording engineer and producer, a pioneer in stereo and multitrack tape recording, emphysema.
- Albert Dusch, 89, German referee.
- Mohammad Isnaeni, 83, Indonesian politician.
- Michel Macquet, 70, French Olympic javelin thrower (1956, 1960, 1964), and handball player.
- Maurice J. Murphy Jr., 75, American politician and lawyer.
- Enrique Perales, 88, Peruvian footballer.
- Valve Pormeister, 80, Estonian landscape architect.
- Vazhappady K. Ramamurthy, 62, Indian trade unionist and politician.
- Baby Lloyd Stallworth, 61, American entertainer, musician, and recording artist, complications of diabetes.
- Walter Volle, 89, German rower, coach and Olympic champion (1936).
- Charles Orville Whitley, 75, American politician (U.S. Representative for North Carolina's 3rd congressional district).

=== 28 ===
- Joan Archibald, 89, Canadian Olympic fencer (1932).
- Margaret Booth, 104, American film editor (Mutiny on the Bounty, The Way We Were, Annie), stroke.
- Morris Curotta, 73, Australian Olympic sprinter (1948, 1952).
- Sugathapala de Silva, 74, Sri Lankan dramatist and novelist.
- Lawrence Dobkin, 83, American television director and character actor (The Ten Commandments, The Defiant Ones, North by Northwest, Patton).
- Laurence Foley, 60, American diplomat and employee of U.S. Agency for International Development (USAID), homicide.
- Erling Persson, 85, Swedish businessman, founder of H&M.
- Annada Shankar Ray, 97, Indian Bengali poet and essayist.
- John Wastall, 74, British Olympic sailor (1972).

=== 29 ===
- Marina Berti, 78, Italian film actress, cancer.
- Muriel Bevis, 74, American baseball player.
- Marion Carpenter, 82, American press photographer, covered President Harry Truman, pulmonary emphysema.
- Glenn McQueen, 41, Canadian animator (Toy Story, Monsters, Inc., A Bug's Life), melanoma.
- Raymond Savignac, 94, French graphic artist.
- Dragan Malešević Tapi, 53, Serbian painter.
- Chang-Lin Tien, 67, Chinese-American educator, 7th Chancellor of the University of California, Berkeley.

=== 30 ===
- Pierre Aigrain, 78, French physicist.
- Alfred Atherton, 80, American Foreign Service Officer and diplomat, United States Ambassador to Egypt (1979-1983).
- Juan Antonio Bardem, 80, Spanish film director and screenwriter, heart attack.
- Rudolf Brucci, 85, Croatian composer.
- Jam Master Jay, 37, American musician (Run DMC), shot.
- Lee H. Katzin, 67, American film director, cancer.

=== 31 ===
- Yuri Ahronovitch, 70, Russian conductor.
- Edward "Moose" Cholak, 72, American professional wrestler, pneumonia.
- Napier Crookenden, 87, British Army general.
- Rodolfo Dávila, 73, Mexican Olympic wrestler (1952).
- Jean-Marie Fortier, 82, Canadian Roman Catholic prelate.
- George Hasenohrl, 51, American football player (Ohio State Buckeyes, New York Giants).
- Bill Hegarty, 71, American football player (Pittsburgh Steelers, Washington Redskins).
- Audrey Hylton-Foster, Baroness Hylton-Foster, 94, British peer.
- Lionel Poilâne, 57, French baker and entrepreneur, helicopter crash.
- Anton Reinartz, 75, German Olympic rower (1952).
- Gene Rock, 80, American basketball player, cancer.
- Michael Stasinopoulos, 99, Greek jurist and politician.
- Gonzalo Rodríguez, 77, Mexican Olympic sprinter (1948).
- Raf Vallone, 86, Italian actor (A View from the Bridge, Bitter Rice, The Godfather Part III) and journalist.
- Eckart Wagner, 64, German Olympic sailor (1960, 1964, 1968).
