= Hans Lange =

Hans Lange may refer to:

- Hans Lange (conductor) (1884–1960), German-American conductor and musician
- Hans Nicolai Lange (1795–1848), Norwegian priest and politician
- Hans W. Lange (1904–1945), German art dealer and auction house director
- H.O. Lange (Hans Osterfeld Lange, 1863–1943), Danish librarian and egyptologist.

== See also ==
- Hans-Dieter Lange (1926–2012), German TV journalist
- Hans-Ulrich Lange (born 1946), German water polo player
- Hans-Joachim Lange (born 1940), German sailor
