= Holocaust (Return of Cultural Objects) Act 2009 =

Act of the Parliament of the United Kingdom

Holocaust (Return of Cultural Objects) Act 2009 (Note: Section 4(1).)
- Act of Parliament
- Parliament of the United Kingdom
- Long title: An Act to confer power to return certain cultural objects on grounds relating to events occurring during the Nazi era.
- Citation: 2009 c. 16
- Introduced by: Andrew Dismore (Commons); Lord Janner of Braunstone (Lords)
- Territorial extent: England and Wales; Scotland; (Note: Section 4(2).)

Dates
- Royal assent: 12 November 2009
- Commencement: 13 January 2010 (Note: Section 4(3). The Holocaust (Return of Cultural Objects) Act 2009 (Commencement) Order 2010.)
- Expired: 12 November 2019 (Note: Removed by the Holocaust (Return of Cultural Objects) (Amendment) Act 2019.)
Other legislation
| Amended by | National Library of Scotland Act 2012; Holocaust (Return of Cultural Objects) (Amendment) Act 2019 |

Status: Amended

History of passage through Parliament

Text of statute as originally enacted

Revised text of statute as amended

The Holocaust (Return of Cultural Objects) Act 2009 (c. 16) is an act of the Parliament of the United Kingdom. Its purpose is to confer, on certain national institutions, a power that was already possessed by other museums to return to their rightful owners cultural objects unlawfully acquired during the Nazi era. It was introduced into Parliament as the Holocaust (Stolen Art) Restitution Bill. The bill was amended to give it a different short title.

== Sections 1 to 3 ==
These sections came into force on 13 January 2010.

Section 1 provides that the act applies to:

- The Board of Trustees of the Armouries
- The British Library Board
- The Trustees of the British Museum
- The Trustees of the Imperial War Museum
- The Board of Trustees for the National Galleries of Scotland
- The Board of Trustees of the National Gallery
- The Trustees of the National Library of Scotland
- The Trustees of the National Maritime Museum
- The Board of Trustees of the National Museums and Galleries on Merseyside
- The Board of Trustees of the National Museums of Scotland
- The Board of Trustees of the National Portrait Gallery
- The Trustees of the Natural History Museum
- The Board of Trustees of the Royal Botanic Gardens, Kew
- The Board of Trustees of the Science Museum
- The Board of Trustees of the Tate Gallery
- The Board of Trustees of the Victoria and Albert Museum
- The Board of Trustees of the Wallace Collection

Section 2 authorises those bodies to transfer objects from their collections if the Advisory Panel has recommended that transfer and the Secretary of State has approved that recommendation. (The bodies in question were previously prohibited by statute from doing this).

Section 3 defines the expression "Advisory Panel". The explanatory notes to the act said that the government intended to designate the Spoliation Advisory Panel as the Advisory Panel for the purpose of this act. That body, created in 2000 as a non-departmental public body under the Department for Culture, Media and Sport, retained its designation under the 2009 act after it was reconstituted in April 2010 as an expert group (under the same name).

== Section 4 – Short title, extent, commencement and sunset ==
This section came into force on 12 November 2009.

Section 4(1) authorises the citation of this act by a short title.

Section 4(3) confers a power on the Secretary of State to appoint the day on which sections 1 to 3 of the act come into force. This power was fully exercised by the Holocaust (Return of Cultural Objects) Act 2009 (Commencement) Order 2010 (SI 2010/50 (C.8)).

Section 4(7) was a sunset clause. It provided that the Act would have expired at the end of the period of ten years which began on the day it was passed. This clause was repealed under the Holocaust (Return of Cultural Objects) (Amendment) Act 2019.

== Application ==
The Advisory Panel established by the act has considered twenty-five claims for the restitution of artefacts and objects. The claims were:

| Institution | Claimant | Object of the request | Date | Advisory Panel's recommendation | Institution decision | Source |
|---|---|---|---|---|---|---|
| Ashmolean Museum | Jakob Goldschmidt's heirs | Painting | 2006 | Rejected | | |
| Ashmolean Museum | Unknown | Renaissance salt | 2014 | Approved | Approved | |
| Ashmolean Museum | Gerta Silberberg's estate | Gothic relief in ivory | 2016 | Rejected | | |
| Bristol Museum and Art Gallery | Margraf & Co GmbH | Oil painting | 2015 | Rejected | | |
| British Library | Unknown | Biccherna Panel (wooden tablet) | 2014 | Approved | Claimants accepted compensation in lieu of return | |
| British Library | Metropolitan Chapter of the Cathedral City of Benevento (southern Italy) | Beneventan missal | 2005 | Approved | Rejected | |
| British Library | As above | Beneventan missal (renewed claim) | 2010 | Approved | Approved | |
| British Museum | Unknown | 14 clocks and watches | 2012 | Rejected | | |
| British Museum | Dr Arthur Feldmann's heirs | Four drawings | 2006 | Accepted | Ex-gratia payment of £175,000 | |
| British Museum | Mrs Bertha L. Gutmann of Caldwell (Heinrich Rothberger's niece and heir) | Porcelain | 2008 | Approved | Ex-gratia payment of £18,000 | |
| Burrell Collection | Unknown | Tapestry fragment | 2014 | Accepted | Ex-gratia payment | |
| Burrell Collection | Unknown | Painting | 2004 | Approved | Ex-gratia payment of £10,000 | |
| Cecil Higgins Art Gallery | Mrs Budge's estate | Four Nymphenburg figures | 2014 | Approved | Approved | |
| Courtauld Institute of Art | Herbert Gutmann's descendants | Oil sketch | 2010 | Rejected | | |
| Courtauld Institute of Art | Dr Curt Glaser's estate | Eight drawings | 2009 | Rejected | | |
| Courtauld Institute of Art | Granddaughter of Franz W. Koenigs of the Netherlands | Three paintings | 2007 | Rejected | | |
| Courtauld Institute of Art | Dr Arthur Feldmann's heirs | Three drawings | 2007 | Approved | Claimant kept two drawings and presented one to the Courtauld | |
| Courtauld Institute of Art | Ms Christine Koenigs | Three paintings by Rubens | 2024 | Rejected | | |
| Fitzwilliam Museum | Mrs Bertha L. Gutmann of Caldwell | Porcelain | 2008 | Approved | Approved | |
| Fitzwilliam Museum | Pinsent Masons, France LLP, on behalf of Mondex Corporation, mandated by heirs of the late Robert Bing | Painting ‘La Ronde Enfantine’ by Gustave Courbet | 2023 | Approved | Approved | |
| Tate Galleries | Victim's descendant (unknown) | Painting by Jan Griffier the Elder titled A View of Hampton Court Palace | 2001 | Accepted. Recommendation for moral compensation | Approved compensation of £125,000 | |
| Tate Galleries | Baron Hatvany's estate | Oil painting by John Constable titled Beaching a Boat, Brighton | 2015 | Approved | Approved | |
| Tate Galleries | On behalf of the Sonia Klein Trust for the heirs and great-grandchildren of Samuel Hartveld | Painting 'Aeneas and his Family Fleeing Burning Troy' by Henry Gibbs | 2025 | Approved | Approved | |
| Victoria and Albert Museum | Emma Budge's estate | Three Meissen figures | 2015 | Approved | Approved | |
