= Lofterød =

Lofterød is a Norwegian surname. Notable people with the surname include:

- Bjørn Lofterød (1949–2026), Norwegian sailor
- Odd Roar Lofterød (1947–2012), Norwegian sailor
