= Holocaust (Return of Cultural Objects) (Amendment) Act 2019 =

Act of the Parliament of the United Kingdom

Holocaust (Return of Cultural Objects) (Amendment) Act 2019 (Note: Section 2(3).)
- Act of Parliament
- Parliament of the United Kingdom
- Long title: An Act to prevent the Holocaust (Return of Cultural Objects) Act 2009 from expiring on 11 November 2019.
- Citation: 2019 c. 20
- Introduced by: Theresa Villiers (Commons); Lord Sherbourne of Didsbury (Lords)
- Territorial extent: England and Wales; Scotland; (Note: Section 2(1).)

Dates
- Royal assent: 4 July 2019
- Commencement: 4 July 2019 (Note: Section 2(2).)
Other legislation
Amends	Holocaust (Return of Cultural Objects) Act 2009

Status: Current legislation

History of passage through Parliament

Text of statute as originally enacted

Revised text of statute as amended

The Holocaust (Return of Cultural Objects) (Amendment) Act 2019 (c. 20), introduced by Theresa Villiers under the Ten Minute Rule, stopped the Holocaust (Return of Cultural Objects) Act 2009 from lapsing.

A legislative consent motion was agreed by the Scottish Parliament as introduced by Fiona Hyslop on 8 May 2018 to fulfill the requirement of the Sewel convention.

== Background ==
The act repealed the 'sunset clause' (in section 4(7)) of the Holocaust (Return of Cultural Objects) Act 2009 which would have meant the act would have expired after 10 years. This means the Spoliation Advisory Panel – a non-departmental public advisory body on claims for restitution of cultural property looted during the Nazi era – continues to function.
