= List of statutory rules of Northern Ireland, 2019 =

This is a list of statutory rules made in the Northern Ireland in the year 2019.

== 1-100 ==
Number	Title
1	The Gas (Designation of Pipelines) Order (Northern Ireland) 2019
2	The Universal Credit (Transitional Provisions) (SDP Gateway) (Amendment) Regulations (Northern Ireland) 2019
3	The Universal Credit (Restriction on Amounts for Children and Qualifying Young Persons) (Transitional Provisions) (Amendment) Regulations (Northern Ireland) 2019
4 (C. 1)	The Welfare Reform (Northern Ireland) Order 2015 (Commencement No. 13 and Savings and Transitional Provisions and Commencement No. 8 and Transitional and Transitory Provisions (Amendment)) Order 2019
5	The Food (Miscellaneous Amendments and Revocations) Regulations (Northern Ireland) 2019
6	The Road Traffic and Vehicles and Waterways (Amendment) Regulations (Northern Ireland) 2019
7 (C. 2)	The Welfare Reform (Northern Ireland) Order 2015 (Commencement No. 14 and Savings and Transitional Provisions) Order 2019
8	The Rules of the Court of Judicature (Northern Ireland) (Amendment) (EU Exit) 2019
9	The Food Safety (Information and Compositional Requirements) (Amendment) Regulations (Northern Ireland) 2019
10	The Human Medicines (Amendment) Regulations 2019
11	The Agriculture (Miscellaneous Amendments) Regulations (Northern Ireland) 2019
12	The Drivers’ Hours and Tachographs (Amendment) Regulations (Northern Ireland) 2019
13	The Civil Legal Services (General) (Amendment) Regulations (Northern Ireland) 2019
14	The Civil Legal Services (Financial) (Amendment) Regulations (Northern Ireland) 2019
15	The Railways Infrastructure (Access, Management and Licensing of Railway Undertakings) (Amendment) Regulations (Northern Ireland) 2019
16	The Residues (Charges and Examination) (Amendment) Regulations (Northern Ireland) 2019
17	The Pension Schemes Act 2015 (Judicial Pensions) (Consequential Provision) Regulations (Northern Ireland) 2019 (revoked)
18	The Environmental Protection (Microbeads) Regulations (Northern Ireland) 2019
19	The Motorways Traffic (Amendment) Regulations (Northern Ireland) 2019
20	The Road Vehicles Lighting (Amendment) Regulations (Northern Ireland) 2019
21	The Misuse of Drugs and Misuse of Drugs (Safe Custody) (Amendment) Regulations (Northern Ireland) 2019
22	The Pension Protection Fund and Occupational Pension Schemes (Levy Ceiling and Compensation Cap) Order (Northern Ireland) 2019 (revoked)
23	The Social Security (Income-related Benefits) (Amendment) Regulations (Northern Ireland) 2019
24	The Planning (Miscellaneous Amendments) Regulations (Northern Ireland) 2019
25	The Guaranteed Minimum Pensions Increase Order (Northern Ireland) 2019
26	The Judicial Pensions (Amendment) Regulations (Northern Ireland) 2019
27	The Public Service Vehicles (International Passenger Services) Regulations (Northern Ireland) 2019
28	The Police Act 1997 (Criminal Records) (Fees) (Amendment) Regulations (Northern Ireland) 2019
29	The Recovery of Health Services Charges (Amounts) (Amendment) Regulations (Northern Ireland) 2019
30	The Automatic Enrolment (Earnings Trigger and Qualifying Earnings Band) Order (Northern Ireland) 2019 (revoked)
31	The Houses in Multiple Occupation (Living Accommodation Standard) Regulations (Northern Ireland) 2019
32	The Houses in Multiple Occupation (Code of Practice) Regulations (Northern Ireland) 2019
33	The Houses in Multiple Occupation (Hazards) Regulations (Northern Ireland) 2019
34	The Houses in Multiple Occupation (Fees) Regulations (Northern Ireland) 2019
35	The Education (Student Support (No.2), etc.) (Amendment) Regulations (Northern Ireland) 2019
36	The Houses in Multiple Occupation (Specified Educational Establishments) Regulations (Northern Ireland) 2019
37	The Houses in Multiple Occupation (Space Standard) Regulations (Northern Ireland) 2019
38	The Houses in Multiple Occupation (Notice of Application) Regulations (Northern Ireland) 2019
39 (C. 3)	The Houses in Multiple Occupation (Commencement and Transitional Provisions) Order (Northern Ireland) 2019
40	The International Joint Investigation Teams (International Agreements) (EU Exit) Order (Northern Ireland) 2019
41	The Plant Health and Seeds (Miscellaneous Amendments) Regulations (Northern Ireland) 2019
42	The Provision of Health Services to Persons Not Ordinarily Resident (Amendment) Regulations (Northern Ireland) 2019 (revoked)
43	The Social Security Revaluation of Earnings Factors Order (Northern Ireland) 2019
44	The Rates (Small Business Hereditament Relief) (Amendment) Regulations (Northern Ireland) 2019
45	The Road Races (Maiden City Stages Rally) Order (Northern Ireland) 2019
46	The Social Security (2018 Benefits Up-rating) Order (Northern Ireland) 2019 (revoked)
47	The Mesothelioma Lump Sum Payments (2018 Conditions and Amounts) (Amendment) Regulations (Northern Ireland) 2019
48	The Social Security (2018 Benefits Up-rating) Regulations (Northern Ireland) 2019 (revoked)
49	The Plant Health (Amendment) Order (Northern Ireland) 2019 (revoked)
50	The Forest Reproductive Material (Amendment) Regulations (Northern Ireland) 2019
51	The Roads (Speed Limit) Order (Northern Ireland) 2019
52	The Waiting Restrictions (Whitehead) Order (Northern Ireland) 2019
53	The Parking Places on Roads, Loading Bay and Waiting Restrictions (Newcastle) (Amendment) Order (Northern Ireland) 2019
54	The Police Pension Schemes (Amendment) Regulations (Northern Ireland) 2019
55	The Pension Schemes Act 2015 (Transitional Provisions and Appropriate Independent Advice) (Amendment) Regulations (Northern Ireland) 2019 (revoked)
56	The Road Races (Croft Hill Climb) Order (Northern Ireland) 2019
57	The Mesothelioma Lump Sum Payments (Conditions and Amounts) (Amendment) Regulations (Northern Ireland) 2019 (revoked)
58	The Social Security Benefits Up-rating Order (Northern Ireland) 2019 (revoked)
59	The Social Security Benefits Up-rating Regulations (Northern Ireland) 2019 (revoked)
60	The Public Service (Civil Servants and Others) Pensions (Amendment) Regulations (Northern Ireland) 2019
61	The Sea Fish Licensing Order (Northern Ireland) 2019 (revoked)
62	The Health and Personal Social Services (Superannuation) and Health and Social Care Pension Scheme (Amendment) Regulations (Northern Ireland) 2019
63	The Employment Rights (Increase of Limits) Order (Northern Ireland) 2019 (revoked)
64	The Parking Places (Disabled Persons’ Vehicles) (Amendment) Order (Northern Ireland) 2019
65	The Sea Fishing (Licences and Notices) (Amendment) Regulations (Northern Ireland) 2019 (revoked)
66	The Marketing of Bananas Regulations (Northern Ireland) 2019
67	The Equine Identification Regulations (Northern Ireland) 2019
68	The Humane Trapping Standards Regulations (Northern Ireland) 2019
69	The Spring Traps Approval Order (Northern Ireland) 2019
70	The Pensions Increase (Review) Order (Northern Ireland) 2019
71	The Public Service Pensions Revaluation Order (Northern Ireland) 2019
72	The Bereavement Support Payment Regulations (Northern Ireland) 2019 (revoked)
73	The Plant Health (Import Inspection Fees) Regulations (Northern Ireland) 2019
74	The Disabled Persons (Badges for Motor Vehicles) (Amendment) Regulations (Northern Ireland) 2019
75	The Road Races (Easter Stages Rally) Order (Northern Ireland) 2019
76	The Energy Performance of Buildings (Certificates and Inspections) (Amendment) Regulations (Northern Ireland) 2019
77	The Social Security (Ireland) Order (Northern Ireland) 2019
78	The Road Races (Drumhorc Hill Climb) Order (Northern Ireland) 2019
79	The Road Races (Cookstown 100) Order (Northern Ireland) 2019
80	The Damages for Bereavement (Variation of Sum) Order (Northern Ireland) 2019
81	The Nutrient Action Programme Regulations (Northern Ireland) 2019
82	The Animal Health and Welfare (Amendment) Regulations (Northern Ireland) 2019
83	The Waste (Fees and Charges) (Amendment) Regulations (Northern Ireland) 2019
84	The Registered Rents (Increase) Order (Northern Ireland) 2019
85	The Common Agricultural Policy (Review of Decisions) (Amendment) Regulations (Northern Ireland) 2019
86	The Allocation of Housing and Homelessness (Eligibility) (Amendment) (Northern Ireland) (EU Exit) Regulations 2019
87	The Road Races (Craigantlet Hill Climb) Order (Northern Ireland) 2019
88	The Road Races (Tandragee 100) Order (Northern Ireland) 2019
89	The Social Security (Income-related Benefits) (Updating and Amendment) (EU Exit) Regulations (Northern Ireland) 2019
90	The Social Security (Income-related Benefits) (Updating and Amendment No. 2) (EU Exit) Regulations (Northern Ireland) 2019
91	The Road Races (North West 200) Order (Northern Ireland) 2019
92	The Employment Equality (Age) (Amendment) Regulations (Northern Ireland) 2019
93	The Road Races (Knockagh Hill Climb) Order (Northern Ireland) 2019
94	The Footpaths (Centre Walk, Cherry Path and Lakeside Walk) Craigavon (Abandonment) Order (Northern Ireland) 2019
95	The Whole of Government Accounts (Designation of Bodies) Order (Northern Ireland) 2019
96	The Finvoy Street, Belfast (Abandonment) Order (Northern Ireland) 2019
97	The Kilkinamurry Road and Katesbridge Road, Banbridge (Abandonment) Order (Northern Ireland) 2019
98	The Bramble Road, Newtownabbey (Abandonment) Order (Northern Ireland) 2019
99	The Plant Health (Wood and Bark) (Amendment) Order (Northern Ireland) 2019 (revoked)
100	The Ballybeen Park, Dundonald (Abandonment) Order (Northern Ireland) 2019

== 101-200 ==
Number	Title
101	The Road Races (Spamount Hill Climb) Order (Northern Ireland) 2019
102	The Student Fees (Amounts) and Education (Student Support (No. 2)) (Amendment) Regulations (Northern Ireland) 2019
103	The Parking and Waiting Restrictions (Newtownards) (Amendment) Order (Northern Ireland) 2019
104	The Prohibition of Waiting (Schools) (Amendment) Order (Northern Ireland) 2019
105	The Parking and Waiting Restrictions (Carrickfergus) (Amendment) Order (Northern Ireland) 2019
106	The One-Way Traffic (Belfast) (Amendment) Order (Northern Ireland) 2019
107 (C. 4)	The Welfare Reform (Northern Ireland) Order 2015 (Commencement No. 13 and Savings and Transitional Provisions (Amendment)) Order 2019
108	The Agriculture (Student fees)(Amendment) Regulations (Northern Ireland) 2019 (revoked)
109	The Firefighters’ Pension Scheme (Amendment and Transitional Provisions) Order (Northern Ireland) 2019
110	The Food Hygiene (Amendment) Regulations (Northern Ireland) 2019
111	The Carriage of Dangerous Goods (Amendment) Regulations (Northern Ireland) 2019
112	The Planning (Fees) (Amendment) Regulations (Northern Ireland) 2019
113	The Road Races (Enniskillen Motorcycle Road Race) Order (Northern Ireland) 2019
114	The Road Races (Cairncastle Hill Climb) Order (Northern Ireland) 2019
115	The Occupational Pension Schemes (Investment and Disclosure) (Amendment) Regulations (Northern Ireland) 2019
116	The Child Support (Miscellaneous Amendments) Regulations (Northern Ireland) 2019 (revoked)
117	The Healthy Start Scheme and Day Care Food Scheme (Amendment) Regulations (Northern Ireland) 2019
118	The Personal Independence Payment (Transitional Provisions) (Amendment) Regulations (Northern Ireland) 2019
119	The Civil Legal Services (Remuneration) (Amendment) Order (Northern Ireland) 2019
120	The Dundrod Circuit (Admission Charges) Regulations (Northern Ireland) 2019
121	The Road Races (Down Rally) Order (Northern Ireland) 2019
122	The Legal Aid for Crown Court Proceedings (Costs) (Amendment) Rules (Northern Ireland) 2019
123	The Magistrates’ Courts and County Court Appeals (Criminal Legal Aid) (Costs) (Amendment) Rules (Northern Ireland) 2019
124	The Road Races (Armoy Motorcycle Road Race) Order (Northern Ireland) 2019
125	The Child Support (Miscellaneous Amendments No. 2) Regulations (Northern Ireland) 2019 (revoked)
126	The Roads (Speed Limit) (No. 2) Order (Northern Ireland) 2019
127	The U1364 Charlestown Road, Portadown (Abandonment) Order (Northern Ireland) 2019
128	The Parking and Waiting Restrictions (Bangor) (Amendment) Order (Northern Ireland) 2019
129	The Taxis (Bangor) Order (Northern Ireland) 2019
130	The Parking Places on Roads (Coaches) (Bangor) Order (Northern Ireland) 2019
131	The Criminal Justice Act 1988 (Reviews of Sentencing) Order (Northern Ireland) 2019
132	The Salaries (Public Services Ombudsman) Order (Northern Ireland) 2019 (revoked)
133	The Road Races (Ulster Grand Prix Bike Week) Order (Northern Ireland) 2019
134	The Prohibition of Waiting (Schools) (Amendment No. 2) Order (Northern Ireland) 2019
135	The Waiting Restrictions (Lisburn) (Amendment) Order (Northern Ireland) 2019
136	The Parking Places (Disabled Persons’ Vehicles) (Amendment No. 2) Order (Northern Ireland) 2019
137	The Parking and Waiting Restrictions (Antrim) Order (Northern Ireland) 2019
138	The Attorney General's Human Rights Guidance (The Use of the Irish Language) Order (Northern Ireland) 2019 An tOrdú um an Treoir ón Phríomh-Atúrnae ar Chearta an Duine (Úsáid na Gaeilge) (Tuaisceart Éireann) 2019
139	The Parking Places on Roads and Waiting Restrictions (Cookstown) (Amendment) Order (Northern Ireland) 2019
140	The Parking Places on Roads, Loading Bay and Waiting Restrictions (Newcastle) (Amendment No. 2) Order (Northern Ireland) 2019
141	The Parking Places, Loading Bay and Waiting Restrictions (Downpatrick) (Amendment) Order (Northern Ireland) 2019
142	The Taxis (Ballynahinch) Order (Northern Ireland) 2019
143	The Parking and Waiting Restrictions (Ballynahinch) Order (Northern Ireland) 2019
144	The Parking and Waiting Restrictions (Belfast) (Amendment) Order (Northern Ireland) 2019
145	The Road Races (Garron Point Hill Climb) Order (Northern Ireland) 2019
146	The Taxi Buses (Belfast) (Amendment) Order (Northern Ireland) 2019
147	The Waiting Restrictions (Toome) Order (Northern Ireland) 2019
148	The Parking and Waiting Restrictions (Strabane) (Amendment) Order (Northern Ireland) 2019
149	The Parking and Waiting Restrictions (Larne) (Amendment) Order (Northern Ireland) 2019
150	The One-Way Traffic (Downpatrick) Order (Northern Ireland) 2019
151	The Plant Health (Amendment No. 2) Order (Northern Ireland) 2019 (revoked)
152	The Universal Credit (Managed Migration and Miscellaneous Amendments) Regulations (Northern Ireland) 2019
153	Not Allocated
154	The Safeguarding Vulnerable Groups (Specified Scottish Authority and Barred Lists) Order (Northern Ireland) 2019
155	The Industrial Training Levy (Construction Industry) Order (Northern Ireland) 2019
156	The Road Races (Ulster Rally) Order (Northern Ireland) 2019
157	The Road Races (Eagles Rock Hill Climb) Order (Northern Ireland) 2019
158	The Pension Schemes Act 2015 (Judicial Pensions) (Consequential Provision No. 2) Regulations (Northern Ireland) 2019
159	The Invasive Alien Species (Enforcement and Permitting) Order (Northern Ireland) 2019
160	The Plant Health (Amendment No. 3) Order (Northern Ireland) 2019 (revoked)
161	The Marketing of Plant and Propagating Material (Amendment) Regulations (Northern Ireland) 2019
162	The Plant Health (Wood and Bark) (Amendment No. 2) Order (Northern Ireland) 2019 (revoked)
163 (C. 5)	The Mental Capacity (2016 Act) (Commencement No. 1) Order (Northern Ireland) 2019
164	The Mental Capacity (Deprivation of Liberty) Regulations (Northern Ireland) 2019 (revoked)
165	The Review Tribunal (Amendment) Rules (Northern Ireland) 2019 (revoked)
166	The Central Reservations on the A1 Dromore By-Pass, Dromore and the A1 Dromore Road, Hillsborough (Stopping-Up) Order (Northern Ireland) 2019
167	The Millmount Road, Dundonald (Stopping-Up) Order (Northern Ireland) 2019
168	The Parking Places (Disabled Persons’ Vehicles) (Amendment No. 3) Order (Northern Ireland) 2019
169	The Tyndale Gardens, Belfast (Abandonment) Order (Northern Ireland) 2019
170	The Monaghan Road, Armagh (Abandonment) Order (Northern Ireland) 2019
171	The Waiting Restrictions (Clogher) (Amendment) Order (Northern Ireland) 2019
172	The Loading Bays on Roads (Amendment) Order (Northern Ireland) 2019
173	The Universal Credit (Childcare Costs and Minimum Income Floor) (Amendment) Regulations (Northern Ireland) 2019
174	The Local Government (Payments to Councillors) Regulations (Northern Ireland) 2019
175	The Court of Judicature (Non-Contentious Probate) Fees (Amendment) Order (Northern Ireland) 2019
176	The Judgment Enforcement Fees (Amendment) Order (Northern Ireland) 2019
177	The County Court Fees (Amendment) Order (Northern Ireland) 2019
178	The Family Proceedings Fees (Amendment) Order (Northern Ireland) 2019
179	The Magistrates’ Courts Fees (Amendment) Order (Northern Ireland) 2019
180	The Court of Judicature Fees (Amendment) Order (Northern Ireland) 2019
181	The Bereavement Support Payment (No. 2) Regulations (Northern Ireland) 2019
182	The Mental Capacity (Deprivation of Liberty) (Amendment) Regulations (Northern Ireland) 2019 (revoked)
183	The Nutrient Action Programme (Amendment) Regulations (Northern Ireland) 2019
184	The Pension Schemes Act 2015 (Transitional Provisions and Appropriate Independent Advice) (Amendment No. 2) Regulations (Northern Ireland) 2019
185	The Radiation (Emergency Preparedness and Public Information) Regulations (Northern Ireland) 2019
186	The Pharmaceutical Services (Amendments Relating to Serious Shortage Protocols) Regulations (Northern Ireland) 2019
187	The Mesothelioma Lump Sum Payments (Conditions and Amounts) (Amendment No. 2) Regulations (Northern Ireland) 2019 (revoked)
188	The Social Security Benefits Up-rating (No. 2) Order (Northern Ireland) 2019 (revoked)
189	The Social Security Benefits Up-rating (No. 2) Regulations (Northern Ireland) 2019 (revoked)
190 (C. 6)	The Mental Capacity (2016 Act) (Commencement No. 1) (Amendment) Order (Northern Ireland) 2019
191	The Review Tribunal (Revocation) Rules (Northern Ireland) 2019
192	The Mental Capacity (Deprivation of Liberty) (Revocation) Regulations (Northern Ireland) 2019
193	The Mental Capacity (Research) Regulations (Northern Ireland) 2019
194	The Passenger and Goods Vehicles (Tachographs) (Amendment) Regulations (Northern Ireland) 2019
195	The Social Security (Capital Disregards) (Amendment) Regulations (Northern Ireland) 2019
196	Not Allocated
197	The Animal Health and Welfare (Amendment) (No. 2) Regulations (Northern Ireland) 2019
198	The Valuation (Telecommunications, Natural Gas and Water) (Amendment) Regulations (Northern Ireland) 2019
199	The Mental Capacity (Deprivation of Liberty) (No. 2) Regulations (Northern Ireland) 2019
200	The Mental Capacity (Money and Valuables) Regulations (Northern Ireland) 2019

=== 201-240 ===
Number	Title
201	The Jobseeker's Allowance and Universal Credit (Higher-Level Sanctions) (Amendment) Regulations (Northern Ireland) 2019
202	The Review Tribunal (Amendment No. 2) Rules (Northern Ireland) 2019
203	The Civil Legal Services (Financial) (Amendment No. 2) Regulations (Northern Ireland) 2019
204	The Social Security (Industrial Injuries) (Prescribed Diseases) (Amendment) Regulations (Northern Ireland) 2019
205	The Employer's Liability (Compulsory Insurance) (Amendment) Regulations (Northern Ireland) 2019 (revoked)
206	The Local Government Pension Scheme (Amendment) Regulations (Northern Ireland) 2019
207	The Misuse of Drugs (Designation) (Amendment) Order (Northern Ireland) 2019
208	The Misuse of Drugs (Amendment) Regulations (Northern Ireland) 2019
209	The Waterways (Environmental Impact Assessment) Regulations (Northern Ireland) 2019
210	The Eggs and Chicks and Poultrymeat (Amendment) Regulations (Northern Ireland) 2019
211	The Social Security (Iceland) (Liechtenstein) (Norway) (Citizens' Rights Agreement) Order (Northern Ireland) 2019 (revoked)
212	The Social Security (Switzerland) (Citizens' Rights Agreement) Order (Northern Ireland) 2019 (revoked)
213	The Social Security (Amendment) (EU Exit) Regulations (Northern Ireland) 2019
214	The Rehabilitation of Offenders (Exceptions) (Amendment) Order (Northern Ireland) 2019
215	The Occupational Pensions (Revaluation) Order (Northern Ireland) 2019
216	The Parking Places (Disabled Persons’ Vehicles) (Amendment No. 4) Order (Northern Ireland) 2019
217	The Roads (Speed Limit) (No. 3) Order (Northern Ireland) 2019
218	The Official Feed and Food Controls (Miscellaneous Amendments) Regulations (Northern Ireland) 2019
219	The Meat (Official Controls Charges) (Amendment) Regulations (Northern Ireland) 2019
220	The Fishery Products (Official Controls Charges) (Amendment) Regulations (Northern Ireland) 2019
221	The Child Support (Miscellaneous Amendments No. 3) Regulations (Northern Ireland) 2019
222	The Child Support (Miscellaneous Amendments No. 4) Regulations (Northern Ireland) 2019
223	The Genetically Modified Organisms (Deliberate Release) (Amendment) Regulations (Northern Ireland) 2019
224	The Parking Places (Disabled Persons’ Vehicles) (Amendment No. 5) Order (Northern Ireland) 2019
225	The Ballysillan Park, Belfast (Abandonment) Order (Northern Ireland) 2019
226	The Ferrard Meadow, Antrim (Abandonment) Order (Northern Ireland) 2019
227	The Official Controls (Animals, Feed and Food) Regulations (Northern Ireland) 2019
228	The U7200 Ballygowan Road, Dromore (Abandonment) Order (Northern Ireland) 2019
229	The Tarry Lane, Lurgan (Abandonment) Order (Northern Ireland) 2019
230	The Plant Health (Official Controls and Miscellaneous Provisions) Regulations (Northern Ireland) 2019
231	The One-Way Traffic (Coalisland) Order (Northern Ireland) 2019
232	The Mental Capacity (Deprivation of Liberty) (No. 2) (Amendment) Regulations (Northern Ireland) 2019
233	The Crown Court (Amendment) Rules (Northern Ireland) 2019
234	The County Court (Amendment) Rules (Northern Ireland) 2019
235	The Family Proceedings (Amendment) Rules (Northern Ireland) 2019
236	Not Allocated
237	The Rules of the Court of Judicature (Northern Ireland) (Amendment) 2019
238	The Magistrates’ Courts (Miscellaneous Amendments) Rules (Northern Ireland) 2019
239	The Galway Drive, Belfast (Abandonment) Order (Northern Ireland) 2019
240	The Waste Regulations (Northern Ireland) 2019

== See also ==
- List of acts of the Northern Ireland Assembly
- List of acts of the Parliament of the United Kingdom from 2019
