= Heinrich Rothberger =

Austrian art collector and entrepreneur (1868–1953)

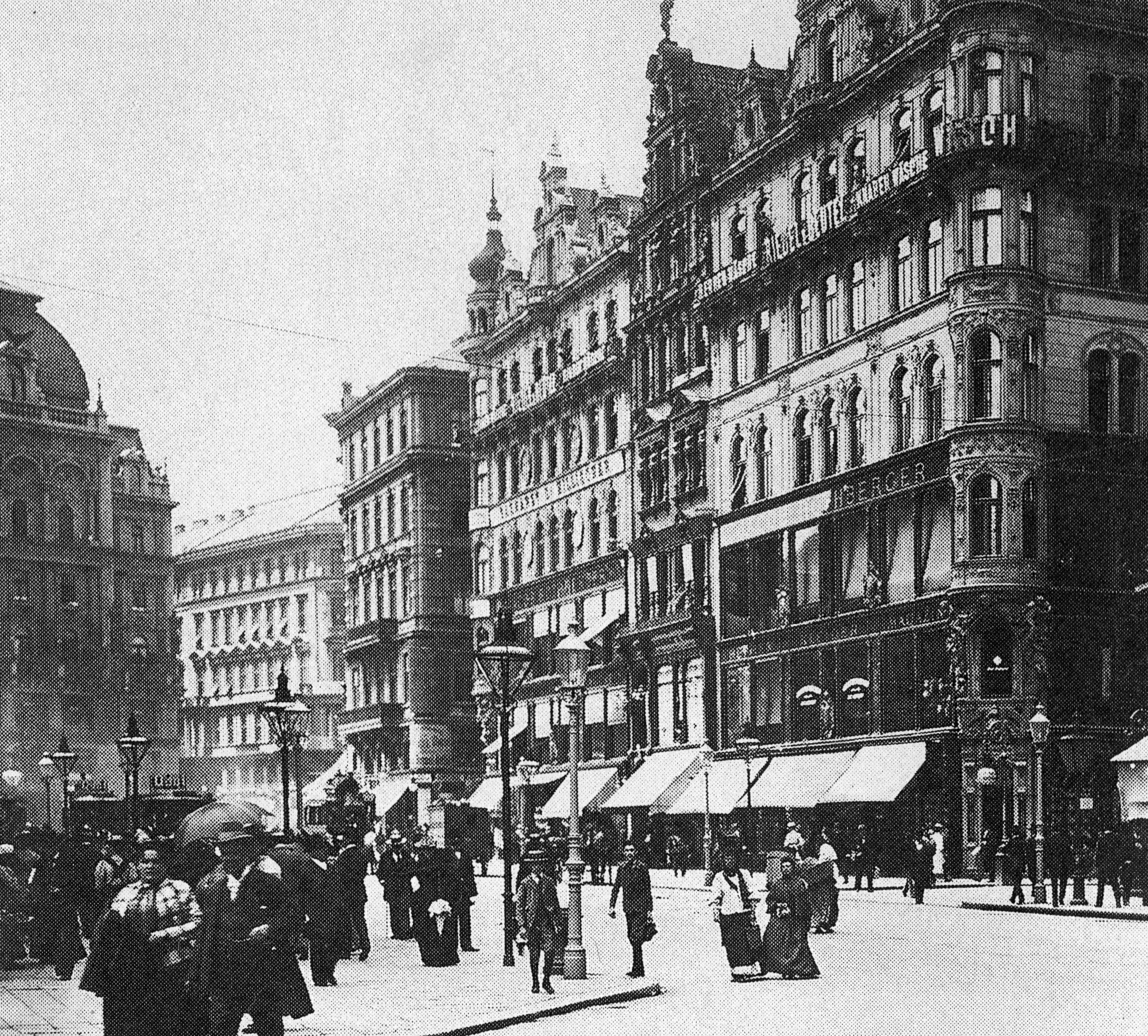
Wien Warenhäuser Rothberger Stephansplatz um 1900

Heinrich Rothberger was born September 13, 1868 in Vienna and died 20 January 20, 1953 in Montreal, Canada. He was a Viennese textile manufacturer, department store owner and collector of porcelain.

== Early years and family ==
Rothberger took over his father's textile company Jacob Rothberger and department store on Stephansplatz in Vienna together with his brothers Moritz and Alfred. He was married to Ella, née Burchardt (1878–1964), and they had two sons Jakob Johann, called Hans (1899–1987), and Friedrich, called Fritz (1902–2000).

== Art collection ==
Rotherberger's art collection, especially of ceramics, was famous and many of the objects are now in museums. The collection included pieces from various periods and regions, some of which are now part of permanent exhibitions in institutions, where they are preserved and made accessible for study and display.

== Nazi persecution ==
After the annexation of Austria in 1938, the Rothberger family were persecuted as Jews. They were arrested and the collections and other property seized. Forced sales took place on 18 and 19 November 1938 at the Hans W. Lange auction house.

== Restitution claims ==
In 2008 the UK Spoliation Advisory Panel recommended restituting porcelain from the British Museum and Fitzwilliam Museum to the Rothberger heirs. Fourteen objects confiscated from Heinrich Rothberger by the Nazis were identified in the MAK collections The Münchner Stadtmuseum agreed to restitute a porcelain box after research proved it had been transferred due to Nazi persecution.

Many of the restituted objects were sold at Bonhams.

== See also ==
Emma Budge

Hermine Feist-Wollheim

The Holocaust in Austria
