= Hermine Feist-Wollheim =

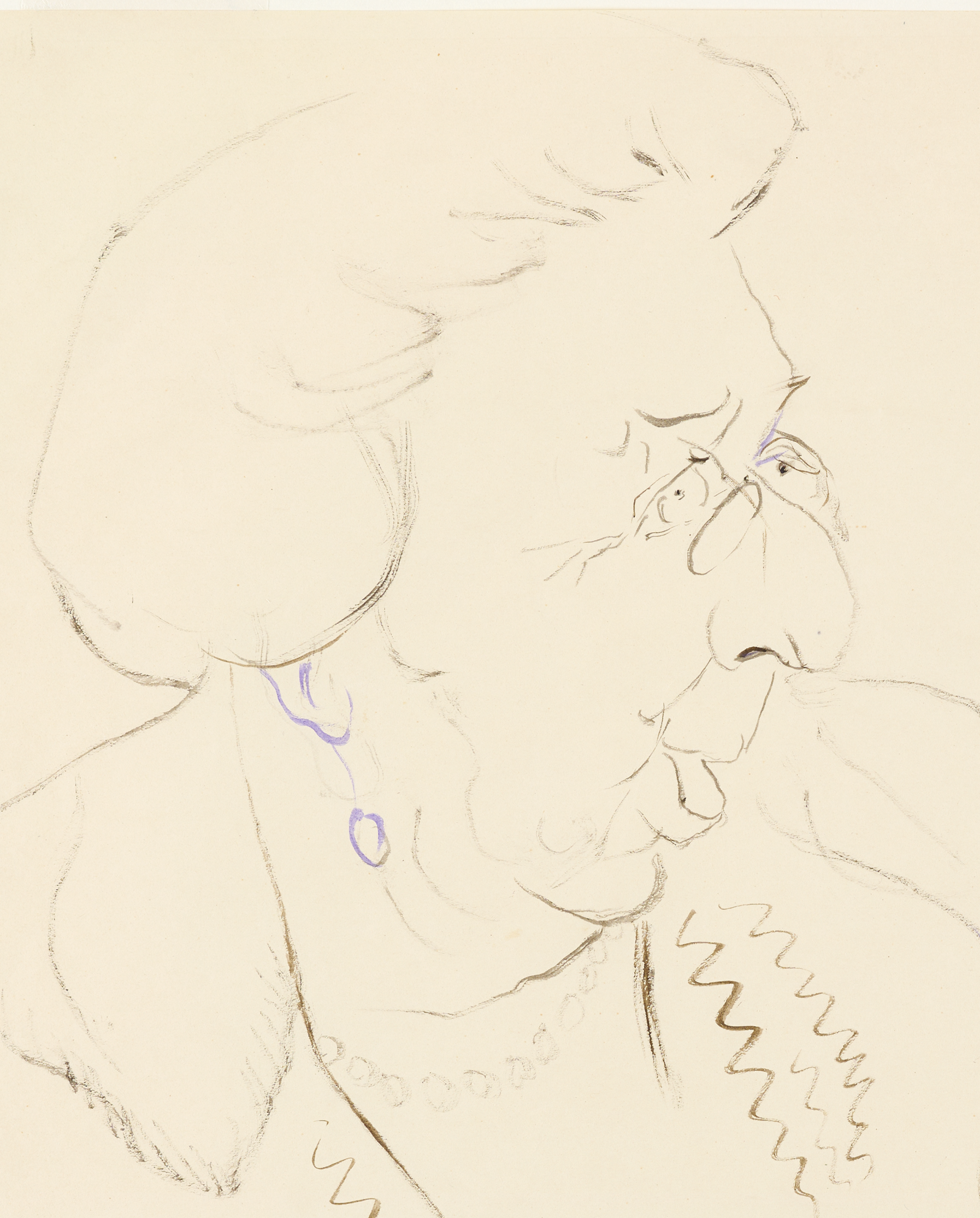
Hermine Feist drawn by Rudolf Grossmann

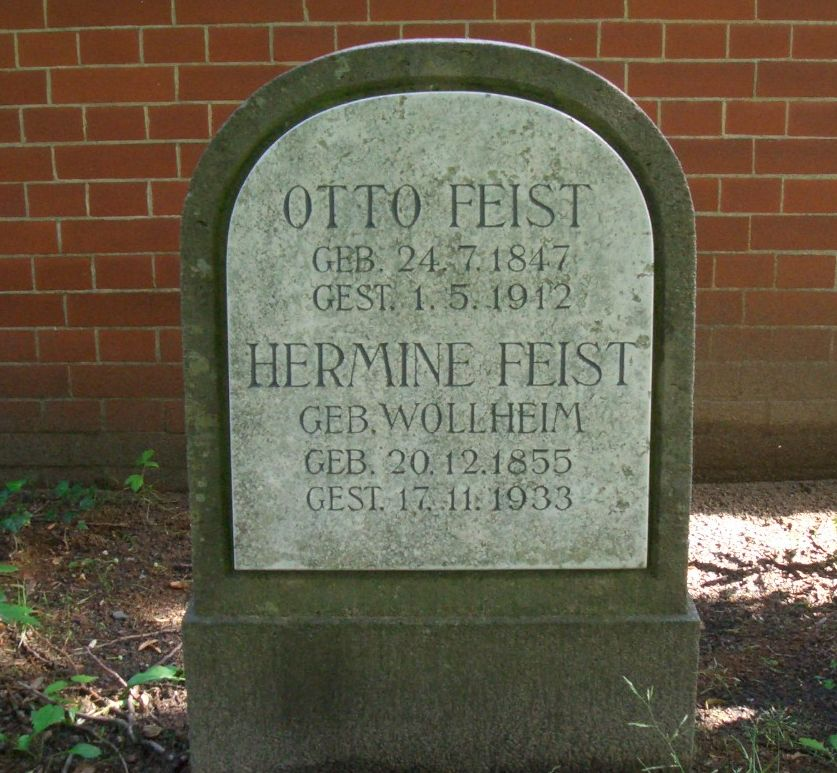
Grave in Friedhof Wannsee, Lindenstraße

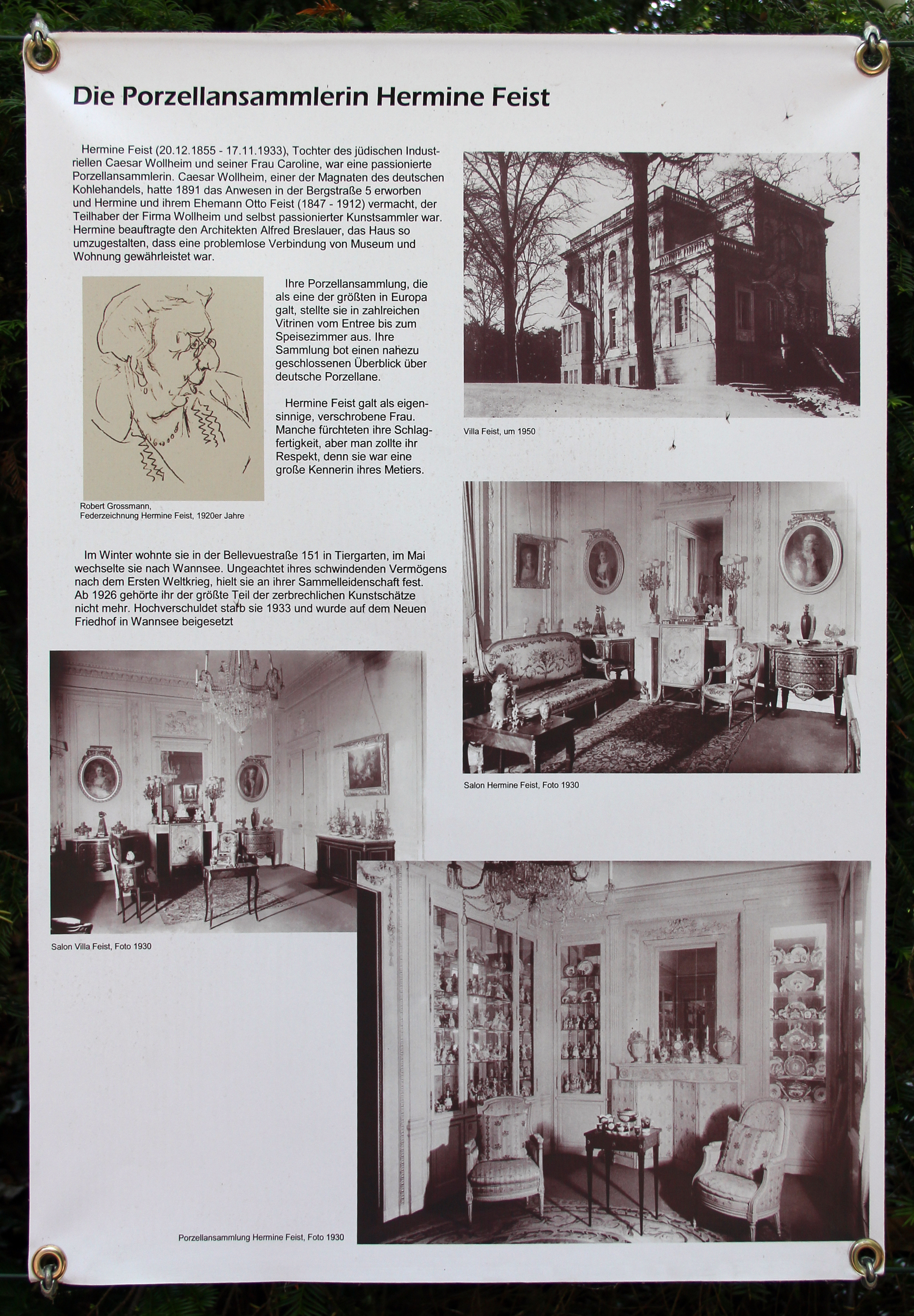
Gedenktafel Am Großen Wannsee 59

Hermine Antonie Feist, née Wollheim (born December 20, 1855; died November 17, 1933 in Berlin) was a German porcelain collector. She is also known as Hermine Feist-Wollheim.

== Life ==
Hermine Wohlheim was the daughter of the Jewish coal wholesaler Caesar Wollheim and his wife Caroline, née Pollack. Her sister Martha (1857-1942) later married the ophthalmologist Max Reichenheim, while her sister Else (1858-1904) was married to the chemist and industrialist Franz Oppenheim, the chairman of the Agfa board. She married the merchant Otto Feist (1847-1912), the son of a tradesman in Frankfurt am Main and had three children Paul (1882-1886), Ernst (1884-1939) and Hans (1887-1952). The latter died shortly after his release from the Oranienburg concentration camp.

== Art collection ==
Hermine Feist and her husband inherited the property and the villa at Bergstrasse 5 in the Colonie Alsen on the Großer Wannsee in Berlin from her father. Hermine Feist commissioned the architect Alfred Breslauer to redesign the villa so that it could be used both for residential purposes and for the museum presentation of the collection. Hermine Feist's porcelain collection was considered to be one of the largest in Europe and offered an almost complete ovelrview of German porcelain. The collection included figurines, vases and tableware from the Meissen, Höchst, Frankenthal, Nymphenburg, Vienna, Ludwigsburg, Fulda and Limbach manufactories. She also collected old lace and jewelry. Together with her husband, she also acquired a collection of paintings that included works by Joshua Reynolds, Jean-Baptiste Pater, Reinhold Lepsius, Joseph Highmore, Franz von Lenbach and Francisco de Goya.

Hermine Feist donated porcelain objects to the Berlin Museum of Decorative Arts. The museum received a small jug made of Meissen porcelain in 1908, a porcelain jug from the Nymphenburg manufactory in 1910, a Viennese porcelain cup in 1914 and a painted figure of a muse made of Nymphenburg porcelain in 1915. She was a member of the German Society for East Asian Art and the Kaiser Friedrich Museumsverein.

Her husband died in 1912, and Feist died in 1933 and was buried in the new cemetery in Berlin-Wannsee. The grave still exists today. Parts of Hermine Feist's collection were transferred to Dresdner Bank and other creditors in 1933. The Free State of Prussia acquired the majority of these objects in 1935, as a result of which they became the property of the Museum of Decorative Arts in Berlin. Other parts of the collection were auctioned off in 1939 at the Berlin auction house Hans W. Lange and in 1941 at Theodor Fischer in Lucerne. Hermine Feist is commemorated by the bust of Madame X/Hermine Feist by Rudolf Großmann, created in 1929, which is now in the Jewish Museum Berlin.

== Claims for restitution for Nazi-looted art ==
The Feist-Wollheim family was persecuted under the Nazis because of their Jewish heritage, and, as of 2024, the heirs of Hans und Ernst Feist-Wollheim have registered 1550 search requests for art objects on the German Lost Art Foundation. Of these five ceramic objects are listed as restituted. In 2013 the Austrian Commission recommended against restituting a bronze statue.

== Literature ==
- Anna-Carolin Augustin: Berliner Kunstmatronage, Sammlerinnen und Förderinnen bildender Kunst um 1900. Wallstein, Göttingen 2018, ISBN 978-3-8353-3180-8.

== See also ==
- Emma Budge
- Eduard Arnhold
- Theodor Fischer
