= Peter Luschan =

Austrian sailor

Personal information
- Nationality: Austrian
- Born: 8 September 1937 (age 87)

Sport
- Sport: Sailing

Peter Luschan (born 8 September 1937) is an Austrian sailor. He competed in the Star event at the 1972 Summer Olympics.
