= Guillermo Calegari Sr. =

Argentine sailor (1924–2023)

Personal information
- Full name: Guillermo Julio Calegari
- Born: 13 September 1924 Buenos Aires, Argentina
- Died: 21 July 2023 (aged 98) Buenos Aires, Argentina

Sport
- Sport: Sailing

Achievements and titles
- Olympic finals: 1972 Summer Olympics

Guillermo Julio Calegari Sr. (13 September 1924 – 21 July 2023) was an Argentine sailor. He competed in the Star event at the 1972 Summer Olympics.
