= The Coast at Cagnes, Sea, Mountains =

1910 painting by Pierre-Auguste Renoir

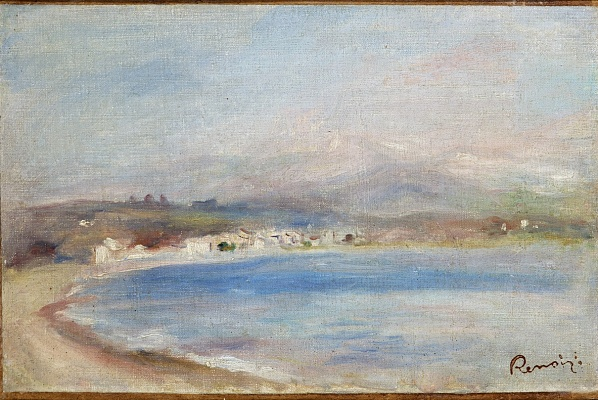
The Coast at Cagnes, Sea, Mountains. Pierre-Auguste Renoir, c. 1910.

The Coast at Cagnes, Sea, Mountains, is a 1910 painting by Pierre-Auguste Renoir representing his late work period (1892–1919). It was bequeathed by Leopold Moller in 1999 to the Friends of Bristol Art Gallery who passed it to Bristol City Council for display in Bristol Museum.

In 2015, the Spoliation Advisory Panel rejected a claim for restitution of the painting to Margraf & Co GmbH (in liquidation), made by the company's liquidator on behalf of the heirs of art dealers Jakob and Rosa Oppenheimer. The panel found that the painting had been sold to an unknown buyer by the Berlin auction house of Paul Graupe on 12 October 1935, as part of a "Jew auction", but that it was "not a sale that occurred as a result of Nazi persecution" as the auction was initiated by Margraf's bankers in order to settle an inheritance tax debt which pre-dated the Nazi rise to power.

== See also ==
- List of paintings by Pierre-Auguste Renoir
