= List of acts of the Parliament of the United Kingdom from 2019 =

This is a list of acts of the Parliament of the United Kingdom passed in 2019.

Acts passed since 1963 are cited by calendar year, as opposed to the convention used for earlier acts of citing the regnal year(s) in which the relevant parliamentary session was held. Each act passed in a respective year is given a chapter number (abbreviated "c."), denoted by Arabic numerals in the case of public general acts, lowercase Roman numerals in the case of local acts, or italicised Arabic numerals in the case of personal acts. These run as separate series.

31 acts of Parliament were passed in 2019; all were public general acts.

indicates that an act has been transcribed on Wikisource, indicates that an act is available to view at legislation.gov.uk, and indicates the location of the original act in the Parliamentary Archives.

== Public general acts ==
Short title	Citation	Royal assent
Long title
Finance Act 2019	2019 c. 1	12 February 2019
An Act to grant certain duties, to alter other duties, and to amend the law relating to the national debt and the public revenue, and to make further provision in connection with finance.
Voyeurism (Offences) Act 2019	2019 c. 2	12 February 2019
An Act to make certain acts of voyeurism an offence, and for connected purposes.
Counter-Terrorism and Border Security Act 2019	2019 c. 3	12 February 2019
An Act to make provision in relation to terrorism; to make provision enabling persons at ports and borders to be questioned for national security and other related purposes; and for connected purposes.
Tenant Fees Act 2019	2019 c. 4	12 February 2019
An Act to make provision prohibiting landlords and letting agents from requiring certain payments to be made or certain other steps to be taken; to make provision about the payment of holding deposits; to make provision about enforcement and about the lead enforcement authority; to amend the provisions of the Consumer Rights Act 2015 (Note: Consumer Rights Act 2015 (c. 15)) about information to be provided by letting agents; to make provision about client money protection schemes; and for connected purposes.
Crime (Overseas Production Orders) Act 2019	2019 c. 5	12 February 2019
An Act to make provision about overseas production orders and about the designation of international agreements for the purposes of section 52 of the Investigatory Powers Act 2016. (Note: Investigatory Powers Act 2016 (c. 25))
Supply and Appropriation (Anticipation and Adjustments) Act 2019	2019 c. 6	15 March 2019
An Act to authorise the use of resources for the years ending with 31 March 2018, 31 March 2019 and 31 March 2020; to authorise the issue of sums out of the Consolidated Fund for those years; and to appropriate the supply authorised by this Act for the years ending with 31 March 2018 and 31 March 2019.
Organ Donation (Deemed Consent) Act 2019	2019 c. 7	15 March 2019
An Act to make amendments of the Human Tissue Act 2004 (Note: Human Tissue Act 2004 (c. 30)) concerning consent to activities done for the purpose of transplantation; and for connected purposes.
Parking (Code of Practice) Act 2019	2019 c. 8	15 March 2019
An Act to make provision for and in connection with a code of practice containing guidance about the operation and management of private parking facilities; and for connected purposes.
Stalking Protection Act 2019	2019 c. 9	15 March 2019
An Act to make provision for orders to protect persons from risks associated with stalking; and for connected purposes.
Children Act 1989 (Amendment) (Female Genital Mutilation) Act 2019	2019 c. 10	15 March 2019
An Act to amend the Children Act 1989 (Note: Children Act 1989 (c. 41)) to provide that certain proceedings under Part 1 of Schedule 2 to the Female Genital Mutilation Act 2003 (Note: Female Genital Mutilation Act 2003 (c. 31)) are family proceedings.
Northern Ireland Budget (Anticipation and Adjustments) Act 2019 (repealed)	2019 c. 11	15 March 2019
An Act to authorise the issue out of the Consolidated Fund of Northern Ireland of certain sums for the service of the years ending 31 March 2019 and 2020; to appropriate those sums for specified purposes; to authorise the use for the public service of certain resources for those years; to revise the limits on the use of certain accruing resources in the year ending 31 March 2019; and to authorise the Department of Finance in Northern Ireland to borrow on the credit of the sum appropriated for the year ending 31 March 2020. (Repealed by Budget (No. 2) Act (Northern Ireland) 2021 (c. 5 (N.I.)))
Civil Partnerships, Marriages and Deaths (Registration etc) Act 2019	2019 c. 12	26 March 2019
An Act to make provision about the registration of marriage; to make provision for the extension of civil partnerships to couples not of the same sex; to make provision for a report on the registration of pregnancy loss; to make provision about the investigation of still-births; and for connected purposes.
Northern Ireland (Regional Rates and Energy) Act 2019	2019 c. 13	26 March 2019
An Act to make provision about the regional rate in Northern Ireland for the year ending 31 March 2020; and amend the Renewable Heat Incentive Scheme Regulations (Northern Ireland) 2012. (Note: Renewable Heat Incentive Scheme Regulations (Northern Ireland) 2012 (SR(NI) 2012/396))
Healthcare (European Economic Area and Switzerland Arrangements) Act 2019	2019 c. 14	26 March 2019
An Act to make provision about paying and arranging for healthcare provided in an EEA state or Switzerland and giving effect to healthcare agreements with such countries; and for connected purposes.
Animal Welfare (Service Animals) Act 2019	2019 c. 15	8 April 2019
An Act to amend the Animal Welfare Act 2006 (Note: Animal Welfare Act 2006 (c. 45)) in relation to service animals.
European Union (Withdrawal) Act 2019 or the Cooper–Letwin Act (repealed)	2019 c. 16	8 April 2019
An Act to make provision in connection with the period for negotiations for withdrawing from the European Union. (Repealed by European Union (Withdrawal Agreement) Act 2020 (c. 1))
Offensive Weapons Act 2019	2019 c. 17	16 May 2019
An Act to make provision for and in connection with offences relating to offensive weapons.
Mental Capacity (Amendment) Act 2019	2019 c. 18	16 May 2019
An Act to amend the Mental Capacity Act 2005 (Note: Mental Capacity Act 2005 (c. 9)) in relation to procedures in accordance with which a person may be deprived of liberty where the person lacks capacity to consent; and for connected purposes.
Non-Domestic Rating (Preparation for Digital Services) Act 2019 (repealed)	2019 c. 19	4 July 2019
An Act to make provision enabling the Commissioners for Her Majesty's Revenue and Customs to incur expenditure in connection with digital services to be provided by them for the purpose of facilitating the administration or payment of non-domestic rates in England. (Repealed by Non-Domestic Rating Act 2023 (c. 53))
Holocaust (Return of Cultural Objects) (Amendment) Act 2019	2019 c. 20	4 July 2019
An Act to prevent the Holocaust (Return of Cultural Objects) Act 2009 (Note: Holocaust (Return of Cultural Objects) Act 2009 (c. 16)) from expiring on 11 November 2019.
Supply and Appropriation (Main Estimates) Act 2019	2019 c. 21	17 July 2019
An Act to authorise the use of resources for the year ending with 31 March 2020; to authorise both the issue of sums out of the Consolidated Fund and the application of income for that year; and to appropriate the supply authorised for that year by this Act and by the Supply and Appropriation (Anticipation and Adjustments) Act 2019. (Note: Supply and Appropriation (Anticipation and Adjustments) Act 2019 (c. 6))
Northern Ireland (Executive Formation etc) Act 2019 or the Northern Ireland (Executive Formation and Exercise of Functions) Act 2019	2019 c. 22	24 July 2019
An Act to extend the period for forming an Executive under section 1(1) of the Northern Ireland (Executive Formation and Exercise of Functions) Act 2018 (Note: Northern Ireland (Executive Formation and Exercise of Functions) Act 2018 (c. 28)) and to impose a duty on the Secretary of State to report on progress towards the formation of an Executive in Northern Ireland and other matters; to impose duties to make regulations changing the law of Northern Ireland on certain matters, subject to the formation of an Executive; and for connected purposes.
National Insurance Contributions (Termination Awards and Sporting Testimonials) Act 2019	2019 c. 23	24 July 2019
An Act to provide for Class 1A national insurance contributions on certain termination awards; and to provide for the controller of a sporting testimonial to be the person liable to pay Class 1A national insurance contributions on payments from money raised by the testimonial.
Wild Animals in Circuses Act 2019	2019 c. 24	24 July 2019
An Act to make provision to prohibit the use of wild animals in travelling circuses.
Kew Gardens (Leases) Act 2019	2019 c. 25	9 September 2019
An Act to provide that the Secretary of State's powers in relation to the management of the Royal Botanic Gardens, Kew, include the power to grant a lease in respect of land for a period of up to 150 years.
European Union (Withdrawal) (No. 2) Act 2019 (repealed)	2019 c. 26	9 September 2019
An Act to make further provision in connection with the period for negotiations for withdrawing from the European Union. (Repealed by European Union (Withdrawal Agreement) Act 2020 (c. 1))
Parliamentary Buildings (Restoration and Renewal) Act 2019	2019 c. 27	8 October 2019 (Note: Royal assent was initially given on 9 September 2019 and signified during the prorogation ceremony that evening. However, as that royal assent was given in the same letters patent ordering the prorogation that were then quashed by the Supreme Court when it ruled the prorogation unlawful, royal assent had to be given again under the terms of the Royal Assent Act 1967. Royal assent was subsequently given during the prorogation ceremony on 8 October.)
An Act to make provision in connection with works for or in connection with the restoration of the Palace of Westminster and other works relating to the Parliamentary Estate; and for connected purposes.
Census (Return Particulars and Removal of Penalties) Act 2019	2019 c. 28	8 October 2019
An Act to amend the Census Act 1920 (Note: Census Act 1920 (10 & 11 Geo. 5. c. 41)) and the Census Act (Northern Ireland) 1969 (Note: Census Act (Northern Ireland) 1969 (c. 8 (N.I.))) in relation to the provision of particulars about sexual orientation and gender identity.
Early Parliamentary General Election Act 2019 (repealed)	2019 c. 29	31 October 2019
An Act to make provision for a parliamentary general election to be held on 12 December 2019. (Repealed by Dissolution and Calling of Parliament Act 2022 (c. 11))
Northern Ireland Budget Act 2019 (repealed)	2019 c. 30	31 October 2019
An Act to authorise the issue out of the Consolidated Fund of Northern Ireland of certain sums for the service of the year ending 31 March 2020; to appropriate those sums for specified purposes; to authorise the Department of Finance in Northern Ireland to borrow on the credit of the appropriated sums; and to authorise the use for the public service of certain resources (including accruing resources) for that year. (Repealed by Budget (No. 2) Act (Northern Ireland) 2021 (c. 5 (N.I.)))
Historical Institutional Abuse (Northern Ireland) Act 2019	2019 c. 31	5 November 2019
An Act to establish the Historical Institutional Abuse Redress Board and to confer an entitlement to compensation in connection with children who were resident in certain institutions in Northern Ireland; and to establish the Commissioner for Survivors of Institutional Childhood Abuse.

== See also ==
- List of acts of the Parliament of the United Kingdom
