= Peter Jackson (sailor) =

United States Virgin Islands sailor

Personal information
- Full name: Peter B. Jackson
- Nationality: American Virgin Islander
- Born: April 1, 1945 (age 81)
- Height: 183 cm (6 ft 0 in)
- Weight: 82 kg (181 lb)

Sport
- Sport: Sailing

Peter B. Jackson (born April 1, 1945) is a sailor who represented the United States Virgin Islands. He competed in the Star event at the 1972 Summer Olympics. Peter Jackson would compete For the event Two-Person Keelboat Men's. Placing Number 16th
