= András Gosztonyi (sailor) =

Hungarian sailor

Personal information
- Nationality: Hungarian
- Born: 19 June 1933 (age 91); Budapest, Hungary

Sport
- Sport: Sailing

András Gosztonyi (born 19 June 1933) is a Hungarian sailor. He competed in the Star event at the 1972 Summer Olympics.
