= Spoliation Advisory Panel =

The Spoliation Advisory Panel advises the United Kingdom Government on claims for cultural property looted during the Nazi era.

The Panel is designated by the Secretary of State under Section 3 of the Holocaust (Return of Cultural Objects) Act 2009 to advise on claims made by former owners or their heirs (or in some cases, states or public bodies) for the return of, or compensation for the loss of, items that have come into the effective possession of institutions in the UK, for example artworks in the national collections. It deals with cases where the objects were allegedly lost through seizure or forced sales during the Nazi era, or through looting or other unlawful transactions during the Second World War. It provides non-binding recommendations for return or for ex gratia payments.

The Panel was established in February 2000 by the Department for Culture, Media and Sport as an advisory non-departmental public body under the Department for Culture, Media and Sport (DCMS). It was chaired by Sir David Hirst until April 2010, when it was reconstituted as a group of expert advisers and Sir Donnell Deeny, a member from the outset, took over as chairman. Following a Review of the Spoliation Advisory Panel carried out from December 2014 - February 2015 by Sir Paul Jenkins the Government response broadly accepted the Jenkins Review as regards renewing the expert membership and the appointment of two chairs and 27 other recommendations. The current chairs are Sir Donnell Deeny and Sir Alan Moses.

== Reports and Recommendations ==
In 2009 the Panel advised against restituting to the heirs of Curt Glaser eight drawings by Lovis Corinth, Pierre Auguste Renoir, Giuseppe Bernardino Bison, Giovanni Battista Crosato, Domenico Fossati and Domenico Piola. Antoine Seilern had acquired them at auction in 1933 and donated them to the Courtauld in 1978 as part of the large "Princes Gate Bequest".

In 2010 the Panel advised against restituting to the heirs of Herbert Gutmann (1879-1942) a sketch by Sir Peter Paul Rubens, The Coronation of the Virgin, in the possession of the Samuel Courtauld Trust. According to the Panel, The Coronation of the Virgin was acquired in 1934 at an auction in Cologne by banker, Dr Richard von Schnitzler (1855-1938) and likely inherited by his daughter, Edith, wife of Baron Kurt von Schröder (1889-1966), a prominent Nazi. Schröder sold it to Stanley Loomis, who auctioned it at Sotheby’s in London on 2 July 1958, where it was purchased by Count Antoine von Seilern (1901-1978) who bequeathed it as part of the Princes Gate Collection to the Courtauld in 1978

In 2014 the Panel advised that it would have recommended restitution of a tapestry to the heirs of Emma Budge, but that the Burrell Collection is "legally unable to dispose of works, that the Collection is not covered by the Holocaust (Return of Cultural Objects) Act". Burrell acquired the tapestry in 1938. The Panel wrote: "But for the restraint on disposal imposed by the Memorandum of Agreement, the moral strength of the claim and the moral obligation on the City would have persuaded the Panel that the appropriate redress was the restitution of the Tapestry to the Claimant."

In 2015 the Panel advised against restituting to the Oppenheimer heirs a Renoir painting in the Bristol Art Gallery entitled The Coast at Cagnes, Sea, Mountains, on the grounds that the painting had not been sold as a result of Nazi persecution but rather to settle an inheritance tax debt which pre-dated the Nazi rise to power.

In 2015 the Panel recommended the restitution to the heirs of Baron Ferenc Hatvany of the Constable painting 'Beaching a boat, Brighton' in the Tate London.

In 2016 the Panel advised against restituting to the heirs of Holocaust victim Max Silberberg an ivory gothic relief in the Ashmolean Museum sold at Paul Graupe Berlin auction on 12 October 1935.
