= Galerie van Diemen =

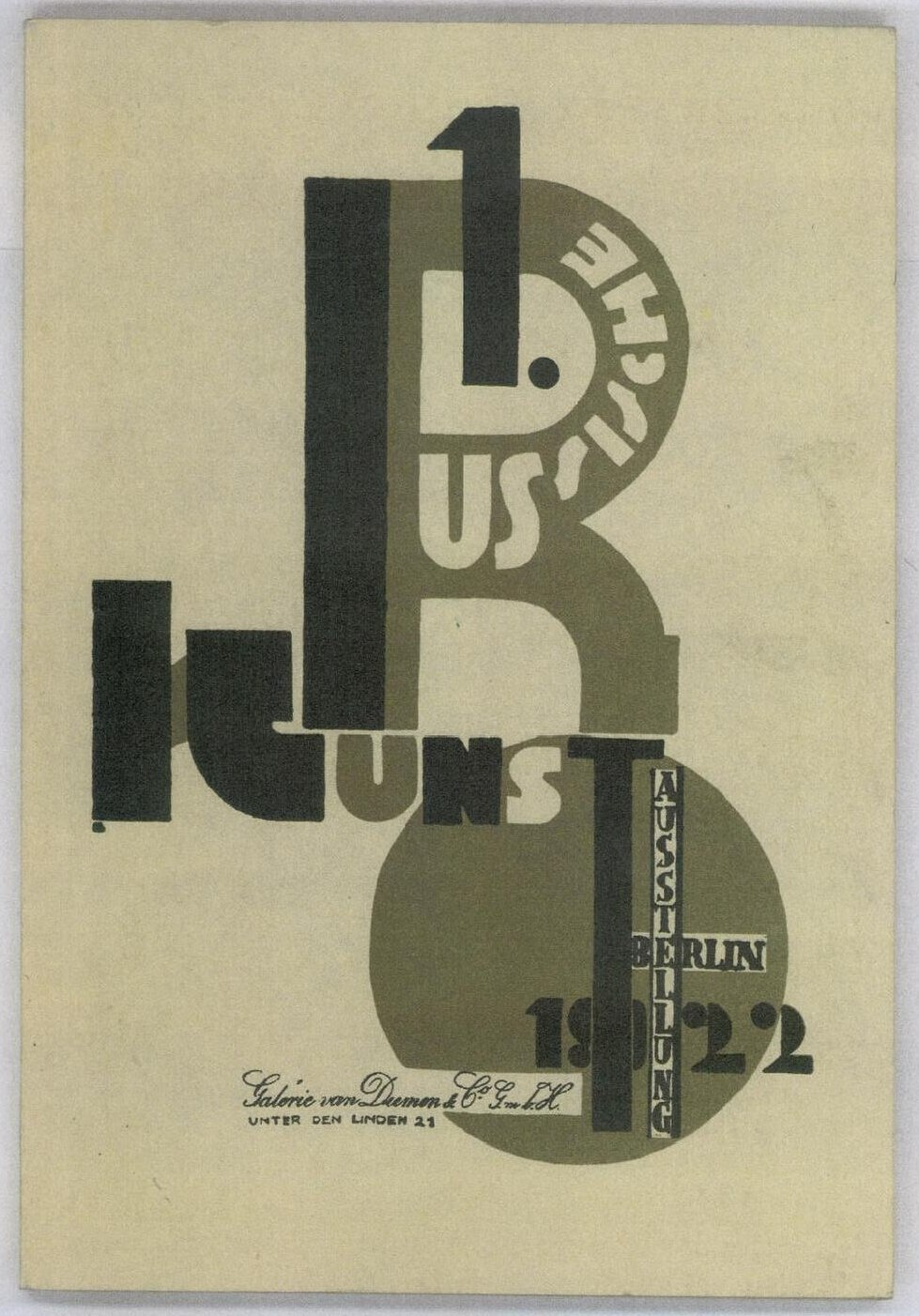
Exhibition 1922

Galerie van Diemen was a commercial art gallery founded in 1918 in Berlin (Germany), and which had branches in The Hague, Amsterdam and New York. Under the Nazis, the German branch was Aryanized and its Jewish owners forced into exile and murdered.

== History ==
Originally specializing in Dutch painting, the Van Diemen Gallery organized in 1922 the first major exhibition of Russian avant-garde art in Europe since 1917. The gallery was located at Unter den Linden 41.

Directors Eduard Plietzsch (1919-1935) and Kurt Benedict (1923-1933) headed the branches van Diemen and Dr. Benedict & Co. Until 1929 these two galleries, together with Altkunst Antiquitätene and Dr Otto Burchard & Co. belonged to Albert Loeske's Margraf group before being inherited by its employees Jacob and Rosa Oppenheimer.

=== Aryanization in 1933 in Nazi Germany ===
When the Nazis came to power in 1933, however, the Oppenheimers were banned as Jews from managing the Margraf group, which came under the control of a Nazi administrator named Bolko von Richthofen, "a zealous Nazi and close acquaintance of Herman Göring".

The Berlin Galleries (van Diemen, Dr Benedict & Co., Dr Otto Burchard & Co and Altkunst Antiquitäten) were liquidated by the National Socialists in 1935 and the artworks auctioned off at the Paul Graupe auction house.

=== Murder of Rosa Oppenheimer in the Holocaust ===
Rosa and Jacob Oppenheimer fled to France in 1933 as refugees. Jakob died in Nice in 1941 and Rosa was interned in the French Drancy concentration camp, then deported to Auschwitz where she perished on 2 November 1943.

=== Merger of the New York branch with Lilienfeld Gallery ===
In 1935, the New York branch merged with the Lilienfeld Gallery, under its founder Karl Lilienfeld, who had immigrated from Germany to New York. It was called the van Diemen-Lilienfeld Gallery until the mid-1960s.

== Nazi-looted art and claims for restitution ==
Numerous claims for restitution have been filed in connection with the Nazi persecution Galerie Van Diemen, the Oppenheimers and the Margraf group. A few include:

- National Gallery of Ireland: 9 October 2017: Restitution claims for three paintings, two by the heirs of Rosa and Jakob Oppenheimer of Berlin, owners of the Margraf group, and one by the heirs of Alfred Weinberger
- In 2000 the painting Bildnis der Marchesa Veronica Spinola Doria (Portrait of the Marchesa Veronica Spinola Doria )(1607-8) by Rubens which was in the museum's collection was claimed by a French legal firm on behalf of the community of heirs of Jacob and Rosa Oppenheimer.
- In 2009, Hearst Castle in San Simeon restituted three artworks to the Oppenheimer heirs.
