= Sailing at the 1972 Summer Olympics – Star =

Star at the Games of the XX Olympiad
- Line drawing of the Star (1968 - 1996 Configuration)
- Venue: Kiel-Schilksee (Olympiazentrum)
- Dates: First race: 29 August 1972; Last race: 8 September 1972
- Competitors: 36 from 18 nations
- Teams: 18

Medalists
1st place, gold medalist(s)		David Forbes; John Anderson	Australia
2nd place, silver medalist(s)		Pelle Petterson; Stellan Westerdahl	Sweden
3rd place, bronze medalist(s)		Wilhelm Kuhweide; Karsten Meyer	West Germany

The Star was a sailing event on the Sailing at the 1972 Summer Olympics program in Kiel-Schilksee. Seven races were scheduled and completed. 36 sailors, on 18 boats, from 18 nation competed.

== Race schedule ==
Due to the interruption of the Games on 6 September 1972, the race was postponed till 7 September. Then the race conditions were unsuitable. Heavy fog and poor wind conditions made it not possible to race until 8 September. Also the medal ceremony was also postponed until 8 September.

●	Event competitions	●	Event finals

Date	August						September										
Date	26th Sat	27th Sun	28th Mon	29th Tue	30th Wed	31st Thu	1st Fri	2nd Sat	3rd Sun	4th Mon	5th Tue	6th Wed	7th Thu	8th Fri	9th Sat	10th Sun	11th Mon
Star (planning)				●	●	●	●	Spare day	Spare day	●	●	●	Spare day	Spare day			
Star (actual)				●	●	●	●	Spare day	Spare day	●	●		Fog	●			

== Course area and course configuration ==
For the Star course area B(ravo) was used. The location (54°30'30'’N, 10°13'00'’E) points to the center of the 2 nm radius circle. The distance between mark 1 and 3 was about 2nm.

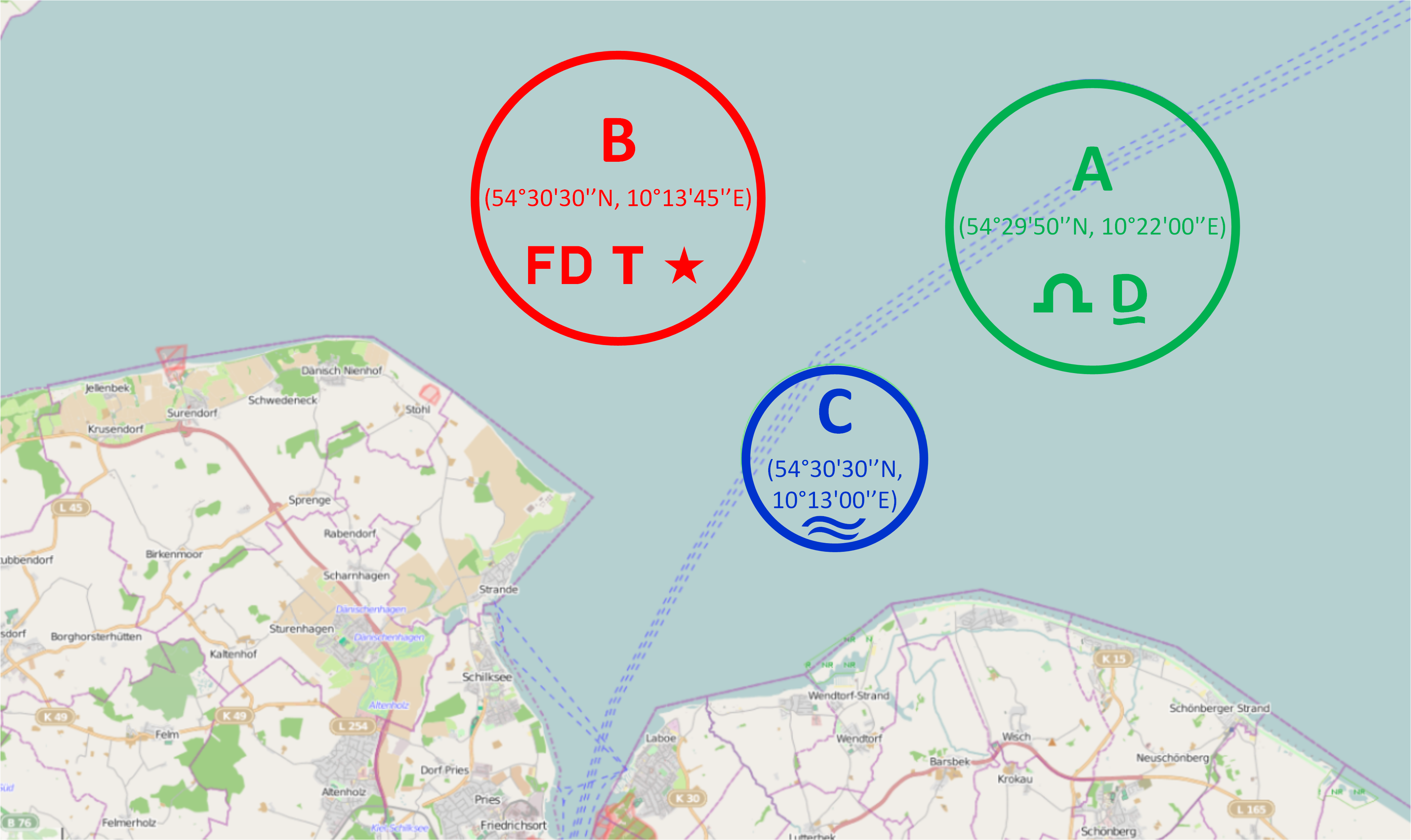

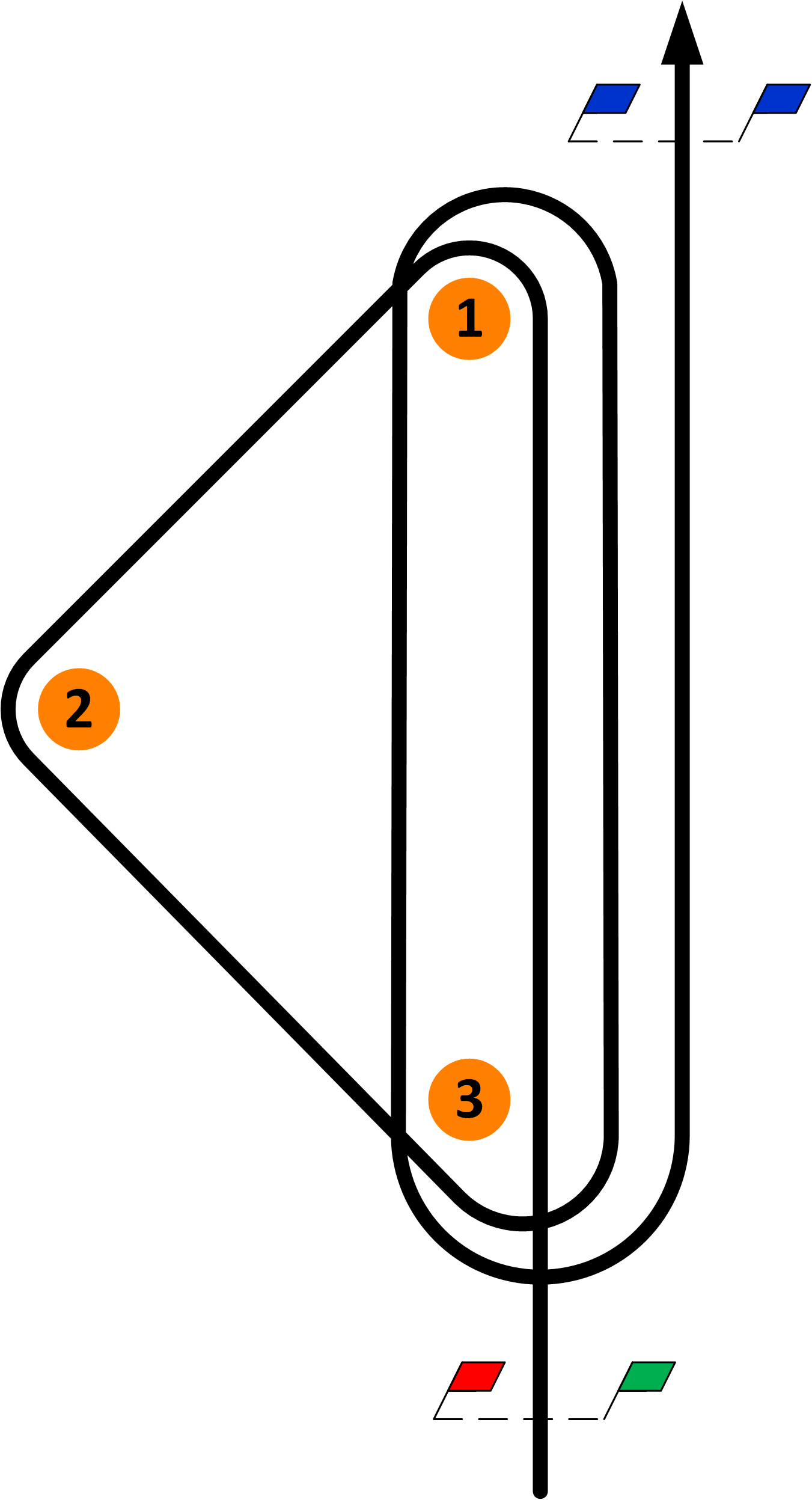

== Final results ==
These are the results for the Star event:

Rank	Country	Helmsman	Crew	Race 1		Race 2		Race 3		Race 4		Race 5		Race 6		Race 7		Total	Total – discard
Rank	Country	Helmsman	Crew	Pos.	Pts.	Pos.	Pts.	Pos.	Pts.	Pos.	Pts.	Pos.	Pts.	Pos.	Pts.	Pos.	Pts.	Total	Total – discard
1st place, gold medalist(s)	Australia	David Forbes	John Anderson	3	5.7	~~8~~	~~14.0~~	2	3.0	3	5.7	4	8.0	1	0.0	3	5.7	42.1	28.1
2nd place, silver medalist(s)	Sweden	Pelle Petterson	Stellan Westerdahl	2	3.0	7	13.0	1	0.0	4	8.0	5	10.0	~~18~~	~~24~~	5	10.0	68.0	44.0
3rd place, bronze medalist(s)	West Germany	Wilhelm Kuhweide	Karsten Meyer	4	8.0	3	5.7	~~11~~	~~17.0~~	2	3.0	6	11.7	4	8.0	4	8.0	68.0	44.0
4	Brazil	Jörg Bruder	Jan Willem Aten	6	11.7	~~10~~	~~16.0~~	8	14.0	5	10.0	1	0.0	2	3.0	8	14.0	68.7	52.7
5	Italy	Flavio Scala	Mauro Testa	5	10.0	6	11.7	3	5.7	10	16.0	~~13~~	~~19.0~~	9	15.0	1	0.0	77.4	58.4
6	Portugal	António Correia	Henrique Anjos	10	16.0	4	8.0	6	11.7	11	17.0	3	5.7	5	10.0	~~17~~	~~23.0~~	91.4	68.4
7	Great Britain	Stuart Jardine	John Wastall	1	0.0	~~13~~	~~19.0~~	4	8.0	6	11.7	11	17.0	10	16.0	10	16.0	87.7	68.7
8	Hungary	András Gosztonyi	György Holovits	~~16~~	~~22.0~~	5	10.0	7	13.0	13	19.0	9	15.0	8	14.0	2	3.0	98.0	76.0
9	Soviet Union	Boris Budnikov	Vladimir Vasilyev	7	13.0	1	0.0	~~DSQ~~	~~26.0~~	14	20.0	8	16.0	14	20.0	9	15.0	102.0	76.0
10	United States	Alan Holt	Richard Gates	13	19.0	~~DSQ~~	~~26.0~~	13	19.0	7	13.0	2	3.0	12	18.0	11	17.0	115.0	89.0
11	Austria	Manfred Stelzl	Peter Luschan	8	16.0	15	21.0	5	10.0	15	21.0	7	13.0	7	13.0	~~18~~	~~24.0~~	116.0	92.0
12	Canada	Ian Bruce	Peter Bjorn	9	15.0	12	18.0	~~16~~	~~22.0~~	1	0.0	15	21.0	15	21.0	13	19.0	116.0	94.0
13	Bahamas	Durward Knowles	Montague Higgs	12	18.0	2	3.0	10	16.0	12	18.0	~~DNF~~	~~24.0~~	16	22.0	14	20.0	121.0	97.0
14	Switzerland	Edwin Bernet	Rolf Amrein	~~DSQ~~	~~26.0~~	16	22.0	9	15.0	14	20.0	10	16.0	3	5.7	15	21.0	125.7	99.7
15	Norway	Bjørn Lofterød	Odd Roar Lofterød	~~14~~	~~20.0~~	14	20.0	12	18.0	9	15.0	12	18.0	11	17.0	7	13.0	121.0	101.0
16	Virgin Islands	Ken Klein Sr.	Peter Jackson	11	17.0	11	17.0	~~17~~	~~23.0~~	17	23.0	14	20.0	6	11.7	12	18.0	129.7	106.7
17	East Germany	Herbert Weichert	Hans–Joachim Lange	15	21.0	9	15.0	14	20.0	~~DNF~~	~~24.0~~	16	22.0	13	19.0	6	11.7	132.7	108.7
18	Argentina	Guillermo Calegari Sr.	Luis Hector Schenone	~~17~~	~~23.0~~	17	23.0	15	21.0	16	22.0	17	23.0	17	23.0	16	22.0	167.0	134.0

Legend: DSQ – Disqualified;
Discard is crossed out and does not count for the overall result.
Gender: – male; – female;

== Daily standings ==
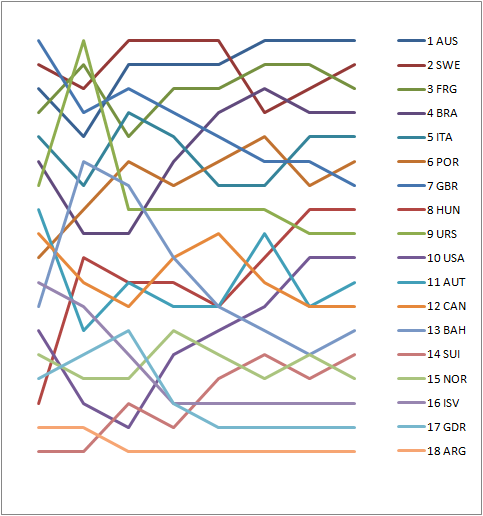
Graph showing the daily standings in the Star during the 1972 Summer Olympics
