= Benno Griebert =

German art historian and art dealer

Benno Griebert (1909 - 2000) was a German art historian and art dealer, and an early member of the Nazi party.

== During the Third Reich ==
A member of the Nazi party from before 1933, Griebert worked as an advisor for the Reich Chamber of Fine Arts in Berlin from 1934 to 1937. At the Reich Chamber of Fine Arts, his role was to ensure that art exhibitions respected Nazi ideology. In 1938-1939 he advised the Berlin National Gallery He also worked with the Nazi looting organisation known as the E.R.R. (Einsatzstab Reichsleiter Rosenberg) and had ties to convicted Nazi art looter Bruno Lohse who stayed with the Grieberts after Lohse's release from prison in 1950.

Benno Griebert's son, Peter, became close to Lohse. When Nazi looted art was discovered in the vault of Lohse's Foundation Schonart, the only person authorized to access it was reportedly the younger Grieber.

Benno Griebert was, along with Fritz Nathan, a key dealer for the controversial art collector Emil Bührle.

== Postwar activities ==
After the Second World War, Benno Griebert initially worked as an art dealer in Constance from 1950; from 1958 he continued to run Alexander Gebhardt's Galerie für alte und neue Kunst (Gallery for Old and New Art) in Munich, which was dissolved in the same year.

== Research projects about Benno Griebert ==
Numerous artworks that passed through Benno Griebert are currently listed on the German Lost Art Foundation's website.

Benno Griebert and his Meersburg Gallery in Lake Constance have been the object of research projects to identify the networks of art dealers trading in Nazi looted art after the war. From 4 May 2018 - 3 February 2019 an exhibition entitled "The Obligation of Ownership: An art collection under scrutiny - Provenance Research at the Friedrichshafen Museum" was devoted to "exploring post-war dealers' networks through whom the German museum acquired many works in its collection whose provenances were far from clean. Benno Griebert and his Meersburg Gallery in Lake Constance were a major source, which also involved Bruno Lohse, Adolf Weinmüller, Herbert Hoffmann and others."

The Aargauer Kunsthaus also undertook provenance research, notably into Griebert's sales to the art collectors Othmar und Valerie Häuptli, noting that "he was probably involved in the Nazi art looting in the territories occupied by the German Wehrmacht".

== Restitutions of Nazi-looted art ==
In 2011 the Landesmuseum Württemberg in Stuttgart, Germany, restituted a 16th-century wooden sculpture of St. John the Baptist to the heirs of Jacob and Rosa Oppenheimer, who had been plundered by the Nazis because they were Jewish. The Jean Paul Getty Museum, which acquired the artwork after it was restituted, noted in the provenance that Nazis had auctioned the looted sculpture to Heinemann and Dr. B. Griesbert, after which it disappeared into anonymous private collections before arriving at the Landesmuseum Württenberg.
