= Finn (dog) =

English police dog

- Other name: Cutter (litter name)
- Species: Canis familiaris
- Breed: German Shepherd
- Sex: Male
- Born: March 2009; Balsall Common, West Midlands, England
- Died: 27 July 2023 (aged 14)
- Nationality: British
- Occupation: General purpose police dog
- Employer: Bedfordshire, Cambridgeshire & Hertfordshire Police Dog Unit (retired)
- Years active: 7
- Owner: PC Dave Wardell
- Appearance: German Shepherd
- Awards: PDSA Gold Medal; 2017 IFAW Animal of the Year Award

Finn was a German Shepherd and retired police dog of the Hertfordshire Constabulary in England. In October 2016, Finn and his handler confronted a youth who was suspected of being armed; the dog was stabbed and the police officer injured to the hand with a large knife. The dog required emergency surgery, but he returned to duty eleven weeks later. The case received widespread media coverage and initiated a popular campaign to improve legal protection for animals in public service, resulting in a 2019 act of Parliament known as "Finn's Law", which went into effect as law in England and Wales in June 2019. It was later proposed for incorporation into law in Scotland and Northern Ireland.

== The incident ==
On 5 October 2016, Finn's handler, PC Dave Wardell, operating with the Bedfordshire, Cambridgeshire and Hertfordshire Police Dog Unit, was called to an incident in Stevenage where there was a search for a male suspect, believed to be armed. Wardell and Finn located the suspect who ran off. After a shouted warning, Wardell released Finn and the dog seized the youth's leg as he was attempting to escape over a fence. Falling on the ground together, the suspect stabbed the dog in the chest with a large knife, before making a second attack in which he slashed the dog's head and Wardell's hand. Despite this, Finn retained his grip on the suspect, enabling Wardell to disarm the youth. When other officers arrived, Finn was taken to a veterinary surgeon and then on to a specialist veterinary hospital where he received emergency surgery in which part of his lung was removed. Wardell later received medical treatment for a hand injury, which was superficial with no long lasting effects on his hand.

Finn recovered from the attack and returned to duty eleven weeks later, before retiring due to age, shortly before his eighth birthday in March 2017. In May 2017 at Stevenage Youth Court, a 16 year-old boy from Lewisham in south London was convicted of assault occasioning actual bodily harm for the attack on Wardell, but could only be convicted of criminal damage for stabbing the dog. His conviction for Criminal Damage (over £5,000) actually gave higher sentencing guidelines for the courts when passing sentence to the defendant. He was later sentenced to eight months' detention in a Young Offender Institution.

== "Finn's Law" ==
Finn's case highlighted the limited legal sanctions available against those who injure animals being used by the emergency services. An online petition on the UK Parliament petitions website for a "Finn's Law" attracted more than 127,000 signatures, resulting in the Sentencing Council recommending that in future, similar events should be treated as an "aggravated offence" rather than criminal damage. However, Finn For Change Member of Parliament, Sir Oliver Heald, with Dave Wardell and Finn as mascots took the matter further by proposing a private member's bill, the Animal Welfare (Service Animals) Bill, which was debated in the House of Commons on 5 December 2017. The bill, which was introduced to the House of Commons on 13 June 2018, provided:

"...for increased protection for service animals by amending section 4 of the Animal Welfare Act 2006 (the "2006 Act") [and also] addresses public concerns about attacks on service animals, where a defendant accused of causing unnecessary suffering to an animal could claim they were protecting themselves and are justified in using physical force against a service animal."

The bill completed all the parliamentary stages and received royal assent on 8 April 2019 as the Animal Welfare (Service Animals) Act 2019. and came into force in England and Wales in June 2019.

In September 2019, Nicola Sturgeon, the First Minister of Scotland, announced that a new Animal Welfare Bill, incorporating "Finn's Law", would be part of the new programme of legislation to be introduced into the Scottish Parliament. On 10 February 2020, a motion was put forward through the Northern Ireland Assembly to incorporate "Finn's Law" to Northern Ireland under its own animal welfare laws. The motion was passed unanimously, and was passed to the Northern Irish Agricultural minister Edwin Poots.

== Recognition ==
In October 2017, Finn was awarded the International Fund for Animal Welfare "Animal of the Year Award" in a ceremony at the House of Lords. In May 2018, Finn was awarded the PDSA Gold Medal "for life-saving devotion to duty, despite being grievously injured while preventing a violent criminal from evading arrest", at the charity's music festival at Cheltenham Racecourse, which was the first time the award had been presented at a public ceremony. In March 2019, Finn was awarded the Kennel Club's "Friends for Life" prize at the annual Crufts dog show at the National Exhibition Centre in Birmingham.

In the spring of 2019, Dave Wardell and Finn participated in the television talent show, Britain's Got Talent, with a mind-reading act which took them to the final and prompted an emotional response from the judges.

== Thin Blue Paw Foundation ==
In May 2020 Finn was named as an Ambassador for the charity the Thin Blue Paw Foundation, an organisation to help support retired police dogs once they have left their role as working police dogs. This is primarily aimed at the other 35 territorial and specialist constabularies, that don’t have their own retired police dog charities like in Finn's home constabulary of Hertfordshire.

== Death ==
Finn died peacefully in his sleep on 27 July 2023, aged 14. The Thin Blue Paw Foundation posted on Twitter that Finn had left a "huge legacy".

== See also ==
- List of individual dogs
