= Eduard Plietzsch =

German art historian and dealer (1886–1961)

- Born: 9 July 1886
- Died: 6 December 1961 (aged 75); Cologne

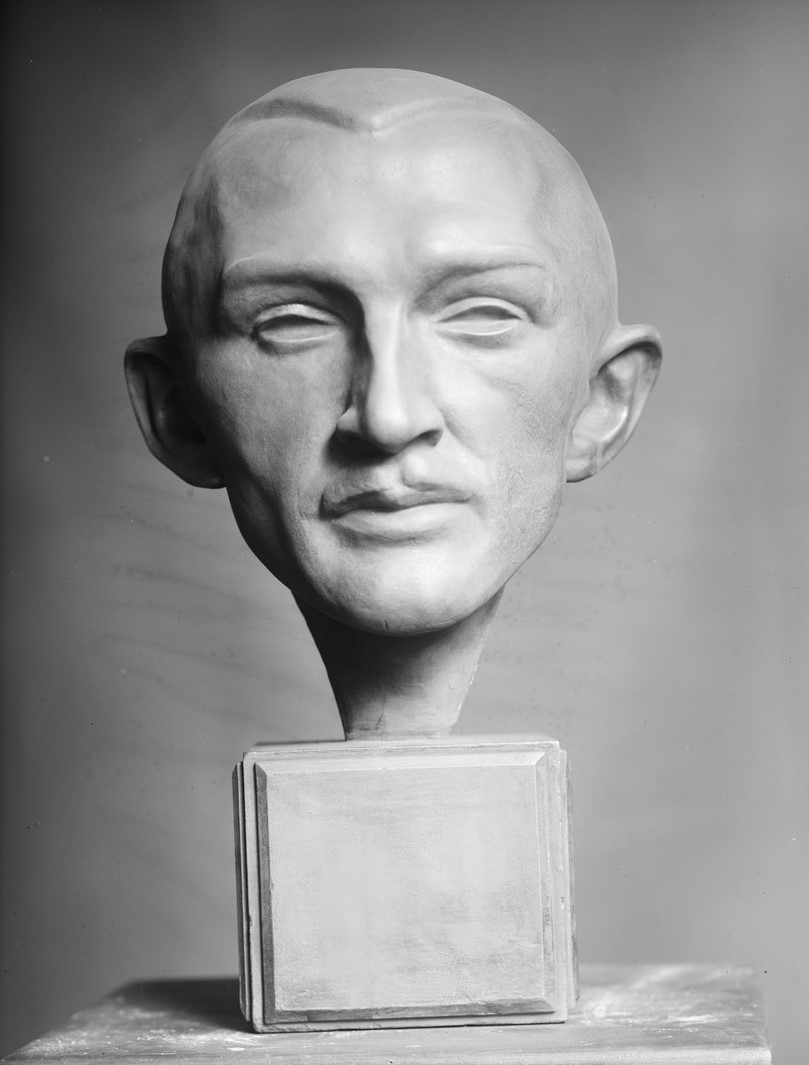
Georg Leschnitzer, Porträtbüste von Eduard Plietzsch (1919)

Eduard Plietzsch (1886 – 1961) was a German art historian and dealer investigated in connection to Nazi-looted art.

Plietzsch was trained as an art historian in Berlin, where he worked for Wilhelm von Bode. He also assisted Cornelis Hofstede de Groot with his inventory of Dutch paintings, becoming an expert on Dutch Baroque artists and earning a byline in Volume 5 for his work on Gerard ter Borch. Later on, after the death of Hofstede de Groot he planned to compile his findings in a book, but was interrupted by WWII. He finally published in 1944 and this remained the definitive update to Emile Michel's version in 1887 until it was updated by Sturla Gudlaugsson in 1960.

He was director and co-owner with Kurt Benedict of the Galerie van Diemen & Co. which had offices in Berlin, Amsterdam, The Hague, and NYC. The Berlin office organized the first exhibition of Russian art in 1922, but it closed in 1935.

During the Second World War, when most museums were closed and little work for art dealers or art historians was available, as an art expert Plietzsch worked for the notorious Nazi art agent Kajetan Mühlmann in The Hague, with his inventory and selection of stolen works of art that were sent to the Führermuseum in Linz. Reported to have been involved in the "confiscation of the Mannheimer Collection and the sale of the Mendelssohn Collection", he was taken into custody by the British and investigated by the Art Looting Investigation Unit in 1945–46, which also noted that Plietzsch advised Seyss-Inquart. Seyss-Inquart would be sentence to death for Nazi war crimes and executed. Plietzsch returned to his career as an art historian after WWII. Historian Jonathan Petropoulos notes that Plietzsch was "shrewd enough to burn all of his correspondance in his cellar" before the Nazis lost the war.

Plietzsch gave his archives to the RKD in 1952.
