= Stalking Protection Act 2019 =

Act of the Parliament of the United Kingdom

Stalking Protection Act 2019 (Note: Section 15(4).)
- Act of Parliament
- Parliament of the United Kingdom
- Long title: An Act to make provision for orders to protect persons from risks associated with stalking; and for connected purposes.
- Citation: 2019 c. 9
- Introduced by: Dr. Sarah Wollaston (Commons); Baroness Bertin (Lords)
- Territorial extent: England and Wales (Note: Section 15(1).)

Dates
- Royal assent: 15 March 2019
- Commencement: 15 March 2019 (section 15); 20 January 2020 (rest of act); (Note: Section 15(2)–(3). The Stalking Protection Act 2019 (Commencement) Regulations 2020 (SI 2020/26).)
Other legislation
| Amended by | Criminal Justice Act 2003 (Commencement No. 33) and Sentencing Act 2020 (Commencement No. 2) Regulations 2022; Judicial Review and Courts Act 2022 (Magistrates’ Court Sentencing Powers) Regulations 2023 |
| Relates to | Protection from Harassment Act 1997; Policing and Crime Act 2017 |

Status: Amended

History of passage through Parliament

Text of statute as originally enacted

Revised text of statute as amended

The Stalking Protection Act 2019 (c. 9) is an act of the Parliament of the United Kingdom put forward as a private member's bill by then Conservative MP Sarah Wollaston, and sponsored by Baroness Bertin, which creates a civil protection order to prevent stalking.

== Background ==
In 2012, the Government amended the Protection from Harassment Act 1997 to introduce two new stalking offences, however, there were little protections where the perpetrator is not a partner or ex-partner, with this act aiming to address these concerns.

The Crime Survey for England and Wales reports that more than 1 in 5 women and nearly 1 in 10 men aged 16 to 59 have been victims of stalking since the age of 16. In 2017 to 2018 there were 1,616 prosecutions commenced under stalking offences, with 73% related to domestic abuse.

== Passage ==
The bill was introduced in the House of Commons on 19 July 2017. It received its second reading on 19 January 2018 and its third reading on 23 November 2018. It was introduced in the House of Lords on 26 November 2018. It received its second reading on 18 January 2019 and its third reading on 6 March 2019. It received Royal Assent on 15 March 2019.

== Provisions ==
The act established stalking protection orders, which limit a stalker's activities. The Police can apply for this via a magistrate's court, which could enable restrictions to be applied to stop stalking behaviour.

The legislation was designed to protect against "stranger stalkers".

== Commencement ==
Parts of the act commenced immediately, whilst others commenced at a later date, such as Stalking Protection Orders which came into force in January 2020.
