= Animal Welfare (Service Animals) Act 2019 =

Animal Welfare (Service Animals) Act 2019 (Note: Section 2(3).)
- Act of Parliament
- Parliament of the United Kingdom
- Long title: An Act to amend the Animal Welfare Act 2006 in relation to service animals.
- Citation: 2019 (c. 15)
- Introduced by: Sir Oliver Heald (Commons)
- Territorial extent: England and Wales (Note: Section 2(1).)

Dates
- Royal assent: 8 April 2019
- Commencement: 8 April 2019 (Note: Section 2(2).)
Other legislation
Amends	Animal Welfare Act 2006

Status: Current legislation

History of passage through Parliament

Text of statute as originally enacted

Revised text of statute as amended

Text of the Animal Welfare (Service Animals) Act 2019 as in force today (including any amendments) within the United Kingdom, from legislation.gov.uk.

Animal Welfare (Service Animals) Act 2019

The Animal Welfare (Service Animals) Act 2019 (c. 15), also known as Finn's law, is an act of the Parliament of the United Kingdom.

== Background ==
After a series of incidents involving attacks on police dogs caused public outrage, a petition on the UK Parliament petitions website was created that called for police dogs to be given the same status as police officers, similar to the law in the United States that makes it a federal offence to maliciously harm a police dog or horse and is punishable with up to 10 years' imprisonment. The petition received over 127,000 signatures and, as a result, was the subject of an extensive debate in the House of Commons. This petition and subsequent debate formed the impetus behind the introduction of the Animal Welfare (Service Animals) Bill, commonly referred to as Finn's Law after a police dog that was stabbed and seriously injured during the course of his work while pursuing a suspect.

== Passage ==
The Animal Welfare (Service Animals) Bill was introduced to the House of Commons by Sir Oliver Heald on 13 June 2018. The Act came into force on 8 June 2019.

== Provisions ==
The act prevents those who attack or injure service animals from claiming self-defence.
