= Herbert Weichert =

German sailor

Personal information
- Nationality: German
- Born: 24 July 1937 (age 88) Kurznie, Germany

Sport
- Sport: Sailing

Herbert Weichert (born 24 July 1937) is a German sailor. He competed in the Star event at the 1972 Summer Olympics.
