= Ken Klein Sr. =

United States Virgin Islands sailor

Personal information
- Full name: Kenneth Klein Sr.
- Nationality: American Virgin Islander
- Born: February 24, 1936 (age 89)
- Height: 188 cm (6 ft 2 in)
- Weight: 80 kg (176 lb)

Sport
- Sport: Sailing

Kenneth Klein Sr. (born February 24, 1936) is a sailor who represented the United States Virgin Islands. He competed in the Star event at the 1972 Summer Olympics.
