= Alan Moses =

English judge

Sir Alan George Moses (born 29 November 1945) is a former Lord Justice of Appeal, a Court of Appeal Judge and the former chairman of Independent Press Standards Organisation (IPSO). He is joint Chair of the United Kingdom's Spoliation Advisory Panel.

== Education ==
He was educated at Bryanston School and University College, Oxford.

== Legal career ==
He was called to the Bar by the Middle Temple in 1968. He was a Member of the Attorney-General's Panel of Junior Counsel to the Crown, Common Law from 1981 to 1990 and was Junior Counsel to the Inland Revenue, Common Law from 1985 to 1990. He took silk in 1990. He served as a High Court Judge (Queen's Bench Division) from 1996 to 2005; Presiding Judge of the South Eastern Circuit 1999-2002 and was appointed as a Lord Justice of Appeal in 2005. In 2003 he was the judge in the high-profile Soham murders case which led to the imprisonment of Ian Huntley. He retired from the Court of Appeal in May 2014.

== Chairman of IPSO ==
He was appointed as the first Chairman of the Independent Press Standards Organisation in 2014. He served two terms, which ended in December 2018. He was succeeded by Lord Faulks QC.

== Chair of Spoliation Advisory Panel ==
He is joint Chair, together with Sir Donnell Deeny, of the Spoliation Advisory Panel which advises the British government on claims for cultural property looted during the Nazi era.
