= Manfred Stelzl =

Austrian sailor

Personal information
- Nationality: Austrian
- Born: 9 October 1939 (age 85)

Sport
- Sport: Sailing

Manfred Stelzl (born 9 October 1939) is an Austrian sailor. He competed in the Star event at the 1972 Summer Olympics.
