= Peter Bjorn =

Canadian sailor

Personal information
- Born: 27 August 1939 (age 87) Montreal, Quebec, Canada

Sport
- Sport: Sailing

Peter Bjorn (born 27 August 1939) is a Canadian sailor. He competed in the Star event at the 1972 Summer Olympics.
