= Louis Pichon =

French modern pentathlete

Personal information
- Born: 8 October 1916
- Died: 14 October 2002 (aged 86)

Sport
- Sport: Modern pentathlon

Louis Pichon (8 October 1916 – 14 October 2002) was a French modern pentathlete. He competed at the 1948 Summer Olympics.
