= Hans-Joachim Lange =

German sailor

Personal information
- Nationality: German
- Born: 2 August 1940 (age 84); Brandenburg, Germany

Sport
- Sport: Sailing

Hans-Joachim Lange (born 2 August 1940) is a German sailor. He competed in the Star event at the 1972 Summer Olympics.
