= John Wastall =

British sailor (1928 – 2002)

Personal information
- Nationality: British
- Born: 23 June 1928; London, England
- Died: 28 October 2002 (aged 74); Bodmin, England

Sport
- Sport: Sailing

John Wastall (23 June 1928 – 28 October 2002) was a British sailor. He competed in the Star event at the 1972 Summer Olympics.
