= Rosa Oppenheimer =

German Jewish art dealer (1887–1943)

- Born: Rosa Silberstein; 31 July 1887; Berlin, German Empire
- Died: 2 November 1943 (aged 56); Auschwitz concentration camp, German-occupied Poland
- Occupation: art dealer
- Known for: art collection
- Spouse: Jakob Oppenheimer

Rosa Oppenheimer (née Silberstein; 31 July 1887 − 2 November 1943) was a German Jewish art dealer who was murdered in the Holocaust. The art she owned together with her husband Jacob is the subject of several high-profile restitution claims.

== Early life ==
Rosa Silberstein was born on 31 July 1887 in Berlin and died in the Nazi concentration camp in Auschwitz on 2 November 1943. She married Jakob Oppenheimer and took his name. They worked together as art dealers.

== Art dealership ==
Rosa's husband Jakob was the managing director of Margraf and Co, which was owned by Albert Loeske who died in 1929. Rosa and Jakob Oppenheimer worked for the Galerie Van Diemen, which was part of the Margraf group.

=== Financial difficulties ===
Loeske bequeathed his shares in Margraf and Co to the Oppenheimers upon his death in 1929, although a competing bequest left the entirety of Margraf's cash reserves to Rosa Beer (née Blaustein), Loeske's long-time companion. Loeske's will was unsuccessfully challenged by his blood relatives, a dispute which was not resolved until 1931. The bequest left the Oppenheimers with a substantial inheritance tax debt of approximately ℛ︁ℳ︁ 5 million (equivalent to $18,900,000 in 2021). Additionally, German tax authorities had placed the Margraf group under investigation for tax evasion, following allegations that it had illegally sold trading stock through a Dutch subsidiary to evade German tax.

== Nazi era, internment and death ==
In March 1933, following the Nazi rise to power, the Oppenheimers were summoned by the Gestapo for interrogation and fled to France. Jakob Oppenheimer retained control of Margraf for several years with the assistance of his son-in-law Ivan Bloch, a Swiss citizen, who was appointed managing director in May 1933. A court order was granted in December 1933 prohibiting Bloch and Jakob Oppenheimer from acting on behalf of Margraf. However, a 2015 report of the Spoliation Advisory Panel found that the court order "was a result of the continuing influence of Mr Oppenheimer, possibly to evade the inheritance tax debt levied by the German tax authorities" by distancing himself from the company. The Jacquier and Securius Bank acquired security over many of the Margraf group's assets, which were sold at auction in 1935 through Paul Graupe to repay the bank's loans and the Oppenheimers' inheritance tax debt.

Jakob Oppenheimer died in France as an impoverished refugee in 1941. Rosa was interned in at the Drancy camp in France, then deported and died in Auschwitz on 2 November 1943.

== Restitution claims ==
The heirs of Jacob and Rosa Oppenheimer have filed several restitution claims for art seized by Nazis or relinquished in forced sales.

In 2008 the Dutch Restitutions Committee recommended that artworks be returned to the Oppenheimer family, stating, "In the Committee's opinion, the applicants have sufficiently shown that the work of art was auctioned at a forced auction set up by the Nazi authorities to implement anti-Jewish measures and the Committee therefore adjudges that it can be considered involuntary loss of possession as a result of circumstances directly related to the Nazi regime."

In 2009, following years of investigation two Renaissance paintings that had been in a forced sale in 1935 were restituted by the Hearst Castle which said that Hearst was not aware of their origins when he acquired them from I.S. Goldschmidt Gallery in Berlin.

In 2011, the Museum of Fine Arts in Boston reached an agreement with the Oppenheimer family concerning a settlement for tapestries that had been the object of a forced sale.

Also in 2011 the Landesmuseum Württemberg in Stuttgart, Germany, restituted to the Oppenheimer heirs a 16th-century wooden sculpture of St. John the Baptist that had been looted by Nazis in 1933, then auctioned off to Heinemann and Dr. Benno Griesbert.

In 2017 the heirs demanded the restitution of two paintings which were at the National Gallery of Ireland which refused the claim based on the research of a provenance expert
