= Bjørn Lofterød =

Norwegian sailor (1949–2026)

Personal information
- Nationality: Norwegian
- Born: 17 June 1949 Oslo, Norway
- Died: 4 February 2026 (aged 76) Son, Norway
- Relatives: Odd Roar Lofterød (brother)

Sport
- Sport: Sailing
Medal record
Sailing
Representing Norway
European Championships
Bronze medal – third place	1972 Karlsbacka	Star class

Bjørn Lofterød (17 June 1949 – 4 February 2026) was a Norwegian sailor. He represented Norway internationally, including twice at the Summer Olympic Games.

== Life and career ==
Lofterød was born in Oslo on 17 June 1949, and was a brother of Odd Roar Lofterød.

Along with his brother, Lofterød placed fifth in the Flying Dutchman at the 1968 Summer Olympics in Mexico. They won a bronze medal at the Star European Championship in Kungsbacka in 1972. The two competed in the Star class at the 1972 Summer Olympics in Munich. After his competitive career, Lofterød was both vice president and sports executive of the Norwegian Sailing Federation.

He was a physician by profession. A pediatrician, he contributed to research on cerebral palsy.

Lofterød died in Son on 4 February 2026, at the age of 76.
