= Hans W. Lange =

Hans W. Lange was a German art dealer and auction house director involved in trading Nazi looted art.

== Career ==
=== Role at Paul Graupe ===
Hans W. (Wolfgang) Lange (1904–1945) was an employee of Paul Graupe (1891–1953), an auction house owner who had to relinquish control because of Nazi anti-Jewish laws . Lange took over the auction house in 1937 and changed the name to Auktionshaus Hans W. Lange. During the Nazi years sold many Jewish collections. Close to Berlin tax authorities, Lange "occupied a key position of the art market during the Nazi era".

Lange auctioned many Jewish collections during the Nazi era. Many of the sales were subsequently recognized as having been forced or made under duress. Claims for restitution for artworks auctions during Lange's tenure have often been successful. Some of the Jewish auctions include, Hamburg-based collector Emma Budge, whose posthumous sale had been initiated under Graupe’s aegis and was slated for 27–29 September 1937 but was postponed to 4 October 1937 due to Benito Mussolini’s state visit; the Meissen porcelain enthusiast Hermine Feist on 22–23 June 1939; and banker Jakob Goldschmidt (J. G.) on 25 September 1941.

In 1940 Lange had sales of over 2 million Reichsmark, a quarter of which was a result of the forced sale of Jewish property. By the end of 1943, Lange had held 35 auctions for about 15,000 items. Lange moved auctions to Vienna in October 1943 to avoid Allied airstrikes.

=== Relationship with Museum Institutions ===
German museums, art dealers and art collectors acquired art from Lange. Notable clients included Reichsmarschall Hermann Göring and buyers for Hitler’s ‘Führermuseum’ or ‘Sonderauftrag’ Linz.

== Nazi art looting ==
The OSS Art Looting Investigation Unit described Lange in the following way:

"Lange, Hans W. Berlin/Zoelendorff, Kleiststrasse 6. Successor to the Jewish dealer Paul Graupe, now in the US. Director of the important Berlin auction house which bears his name. Prominent in purchases and auctions of works of art acquired in occupied countries. Close contact of Haberstock, Lohse, Dietrich and other key figures. Father, Hans Lange, resident of Alt Aussee, Austria, Rischendorf 64."

"The Gestapo confiscated the Fischer family's art collection, including the Pissarro painting, along with their apartment at Wattmanngasse 11 in Vienna's XIII district. Two years later, on May 21, 1940, the painting was auctioned off at the then still state-owned Dorotheum pawnbrokers and auction house in Vienna as lot no. 339 with an estimated price of just 1,200 marks. It was bought there by the Viennese art dealer Eugen Primavesi, who ran a gallery at Kärntnerring 6 - allegedly on behalf of the Berlin auctioneer Hans W. Lange, to whom he claims to have sent the painting immediately. Traces of the Pissarro painting were subsequently lost. Lange and his secretary, Herta Schoene, stated after the war that they had never received the painting. However, a flower painting by Lovis Corinth, which had also been stolen from the Fischers, was actually found by Lovis Corinth shortly after the war in the museum in Hanover, to whichto which it had been sold by the Berlin property owner Conrad Doebbeke. Lange's Lange's statement is therefore not very credible."

== See also ==
- List of claims for restitution of Nazi-looted art
- The Holocaust
- Aryanization
