= Odd Roar Lofterød =

Norwegian sailor

Personal information
- Born: 8 April 1947 Oslo, Norway
- Died: 14 September 2012 (aged 65)
- Relatives: Bjørn Lofterød (brother)

Sport
- Sport: Sailing
Medal record
Sailing
Representing Norway
World Championships
Gold medal – first place	1987 Kiel	One ton class

Odd Roar Lofterød (8 April 1947 – 14 September 2012) was a Norwegian sailor and business executive.

== Personal life ==
Lofterød was born in Oslo on 8 April 1947, and was a brother of Bjørn Lofterød.

== Sports career ==
He competed at the 1972 Summer Olympics in Munich.

He won the One Ton Cup, the sailing world championship in the One Ton class, in 1987, as a crew for Crown Prince Harald.

== Business career ==
His father, Odd Roar Lofterød senior, established the Swiss sportswear company Odlo, originally founded in Oppegård in Norway in 1945 as Odd Lofterød A/S. The trade mark Odlo was registered in 1946, and the company was renamed to Odlo Fabrikker in 1948. In 1979 Odd Roar Lofterød junior took over the company, and in 1986 they established Odlo International as the new company head quarter in Switzerland.

Lofterød died on 14 September 2012, at the age of 65.
