= Emma Budge =

Jewish art collector (1852–1937)

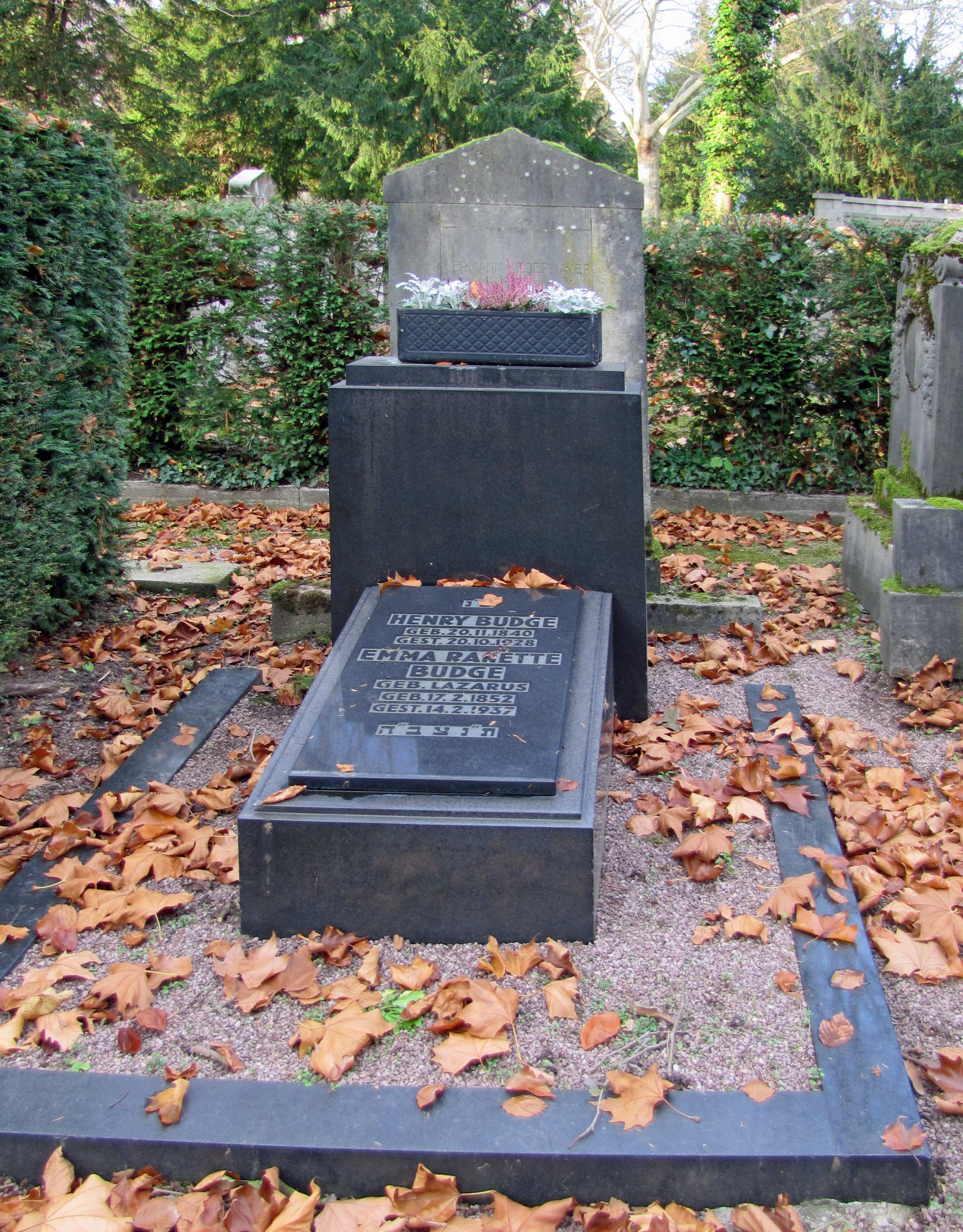
Emma Budge's grave

Emma Ranette Budge (née Lazarus; 17 February 1852, Hamburg – 14 February 1937) was a wealthy German Jewish socialite, philanthropist and art collector .

== Biography ==
Born in Hamburg in 1852, Budge was the daughter of the merchant Ludwig Lazarus. She married Henry Budge and they emigrated to the US.

Budge and her husband returned to Hamburg in 1903. They lived at the so-called "Budge-Palais" on the Alster, Hamburg, and amassed a large art collection.

In her will, Budge had specified that her art collection was not to be sold in Nazi Germany. However, a large portion of it was sold at auction in Berlin in October 1937, the proceeds going to a Budge estate account at M. M. Warburg & Co. bank. The bank was subsequently Aryanized, her Jewish executors dismissed, and her heirs defrauded of their money.

At the 1937 auction, Otto and Magdalena Blohm bought seven 18th-century Italian commedia dell'arte porcelain figures that had been part of the Budge collection. Edward and Kiyi Pflueger later acquired the figures and in 2006 bequeathed them to the Museum of Fine Arts, Boston (MFA). The Budge heirs later demanded their return. In May 2017, the MFA reached a settlement with the Budge family.

== See also ==
- List of claims for restitution for Nazi-looted art
- The Holocaust
- Aryanization
- Meissen porcelain
