= Max Silberberg =

German Jewish entrepreneur, art collector and patron

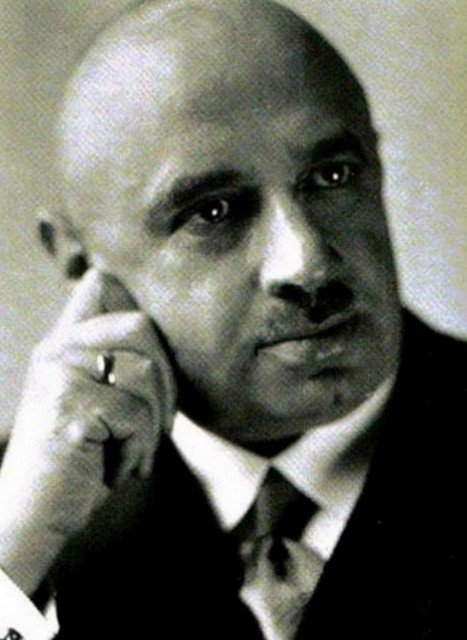
- Max Silberberg
- Born: 27 February 1878; Neuruppin, Brandenburg, German Empire
- Died: after 1942; Auschwitz concentration camp, German-occupied Poland
- Occupations: Industrialist, art collector, philanthropist
- Known for: Assembling a significant Impressionist art collection, looted by the Nazis
- Spouse: Johanna Silberberg (née Weisenberg)
- Children: Alfred Silberberg

Max Silberberg (27 February 1878, in Neuruppin – after 1942, in Ghetto Theresienstadt or Auschwitz concentration camp) was a major cultural figure in Breslau, a German Jewish entrepreneur, art collector and patron who was robbed and murdered by the Nazis. His art collection, among the finest of its era, has been the object of numerous restitution claims.

== Early life ==
Max Silberberg was born in Neuruppin in Brandenburg in 1878 as the son of the tailor Isidor Silberberg. Silberberg's talents were recognized and he was sent to high school while his sister Margarete trained as a seamstress. After he had completed his military service, the family moved to Beuthen in Upper Silesia. At the age of 24, Silberberg joined the factory for metal processing M. Weißenberg, part of the Vereinigung der Magnesitwerke cartel, which manufactured refractory building materials for lining blast furnaces. He married Johanna Weißenberg, the owner's daughter, and became himself a co-owner of the company. The couple's son Alfred Silberberg was born on 8 November 1908.

In 1920 Max Silberberg moved with his family to Breslau, where they lived in a large villa at Landsberger Straße 1–3 (today ul. Kutnowska). The dining room, including the furniture and the carpet, was designed by architect August Endell in 1923 in the Art Deco style and decorated with an outstanding collection of paintings, mostly German and French works from the 19th and 20th centuries. Silberberg also had an extensive art library, featuring mainly French-language literature on modern art.

Silberberg was involved in the cultural life of the city and organized lectures in his house, on subjects such as on the history of Judaism, to which he invited outsiders. He was one of the co-founders of the city's Jewish Museum Association, as its 1st chairman since March 1928. Together with the director of the Breslau Castle Museum, Erwin Hinze, Silberberg was one of the organizers of the exhibition Judaism in the history of Silesia in 1929. In addition, he supported the Jewish Museum as a patron and donated a silver Torah shield from the 18th century and a silver Torah pointer. He was also a member of the board of trustees of the Silesian Museum of Fine Arts and helped found the Society of Friends of Art, which supported the museum as a funding institution. He also served as a member of the Society's board.

In 1932, Silberberg sold 19 artworks at the George Petit auction house in Paris. After the auction he still owned many artworks, including "works by Courbet, Delacroix, Manet, Pissarro, and Sisley and remained an avide collector, even continuing to purchase new works".

== Nazi persecution, robbery and murder ==
The robbery and murder of Silberberg by the Nazi was described as a "Model Case" of Jewish persecution by the historian Monika Tatzkow in her chapter on Silberberg published in Lost lives, lost art: Jewish collectors, Nazi art theft and the quest for justice.

When the Nazis came to power on 30 January 1933, Silberberg's position changed overnight. In Breslau (later called Wroclaw) Nazi persecution of Jews was immediate and devastating. Silberberg, like another famous Jewish Breslau art collector, Ismar Littmann, immediately lost all of his public offices and was harassed and robbed. In 1935 SS-Sturmbannführer Ernst Müller took Silberberg's villa for the SS security service, forcing the sale at a low price. Silberberg moved with his family into a small rented apartment and was forced to part with the majority of his art collection, which was auctioned in several "Jew auctions" at the Graupe auction house in Berlin. In addition to paintings and drawings by Menzel, Degas, Cézanne and others, and sculptures by Rodin, his extensive library was also sold off.

During the November pogroms in 1938, his son Alfred Silberberg was deported to the Buchenwald concentration camp and imprisoned for eight weeks. Released on the condition that he leave Germany immediately, Alfred and his wife Gerta fled to Great Britain.

Silberberg's Weissenberg company was “Aryanized” and transferred to industrialist Carl Wilhelm from Breslau, and Silberberg's wealth plundered by special taxes designed by Nazis to rob Jews of their assets. Forced to sell some of the few works of art in his possession to the Silesian Museum of Fine Arts, Silberberg did not receive the sales proceeds, which went to the "Aryanized" company Weißenberg. The few artworks that remained in his possession until 1940, were "Aryanized" by the Museum of Fine Arts in Breslau.

At the end of 1941, his son Alfred, living in exile in London, received the last sign of life from his parents. Max and Johanna Silberberg were deported by the Nazis from Grüssau monastery assembly camp, on 3 May 1942 - presumably to the Theresienstadt ghetto. There are no records of the exact day or place of death. Various historians assume that Silberberg and his wife were murdered in Auschwitz. After the Second World War, Alfred Silberberg had his parents declared dead on 8 May 1945.

== The Silberberg Collection ==
At the beginning of the 20th century, Max Silberberg built up one of the most important private art collections in the German Empire. He was part of a remarkable group of art collectors, many of them Jewish, living in Breslau in the early 20th century. Many of their remarkable collections were seized by the Nazis. Among the Jewish collectors were Emil Kaim, Leo Lewin, Ismar Littmann, Theodor Loewe, Wilhelm Perlhöfter, Max Pringsheim, Adolf Rothenberg, Carl Sachs, Max Silberberg and Leo Smoschewer.

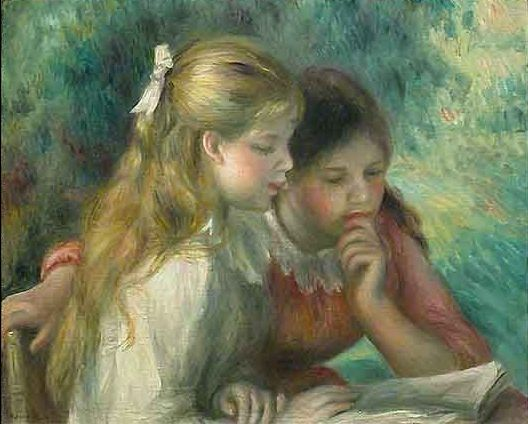
Pierre-August Renoir:
Die Lektüre
Louvre, Paris

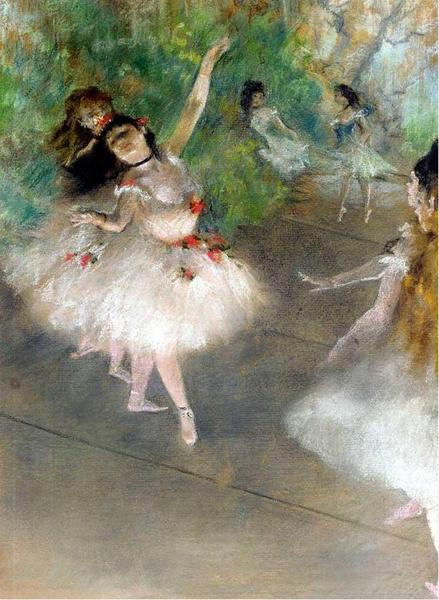
Edgar Degas:
Balletttänzerinnen
Privatsammlung

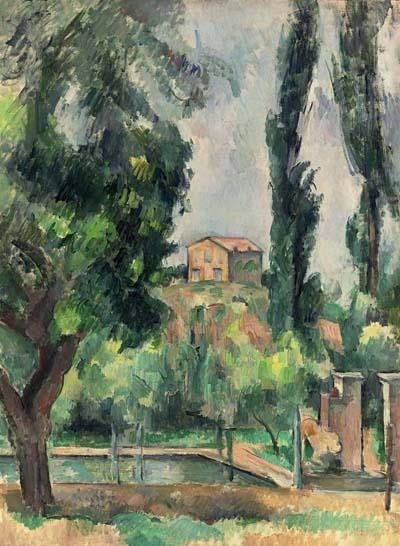
Paul Cézanne:
Jas de Bouffan
Privatsammlung

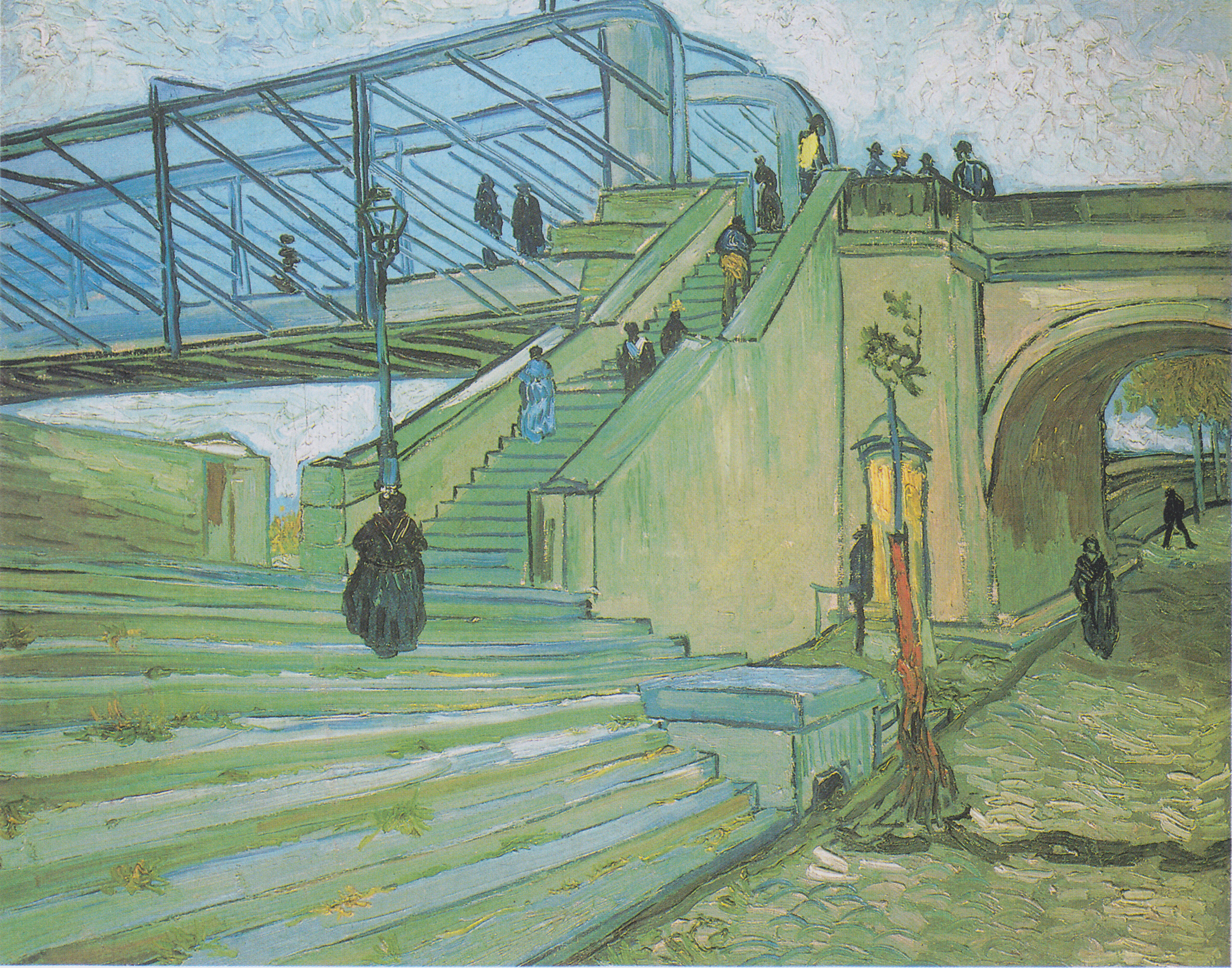
Vincent van Gogh:
Die Brücke von Trinquetaille
Privatsammlung, Leihgabe im Kunsthaus Zürich

Art historians estimate Silberberg's art collection at around 130 to 250 paintings, drawings and sculptures, one of the most important art collections in the German Empire, with a focus on German and French art from the 19th and early 20th centuries. including works such as Portrait of a Man with Glasses by Wilhelm Leibl, Wilhelm Trübner's paintings The Way to the Church in Neuburg near Heidelberg and Lady with White Stockings, and Self-portrait with a yellow hat, by Kleinenberg from 1876 and The Labung from 1880 by Hans von Marées. Silberman donated Still Life with a Bundle of Leeks, Apples and Cheese dome by Carl Schuch to the museum in Breslau, which is now in the National Museum in Warsaw. The collection also included German Impressionism such as In the Kitchen and Market in Haarlem by Max Liebermann or Flieder im Glaskrug by Lovis Corinth as well as drawings by Adolph Menzel, Hans Purrmann and Otto Müller and sculptures by his contemporary Georg Kolbe. Silberman also owned drawings by Gustav Klimt and Paul Klee and Stockhornkette mit Thunersee by Ferdinand Hodler.

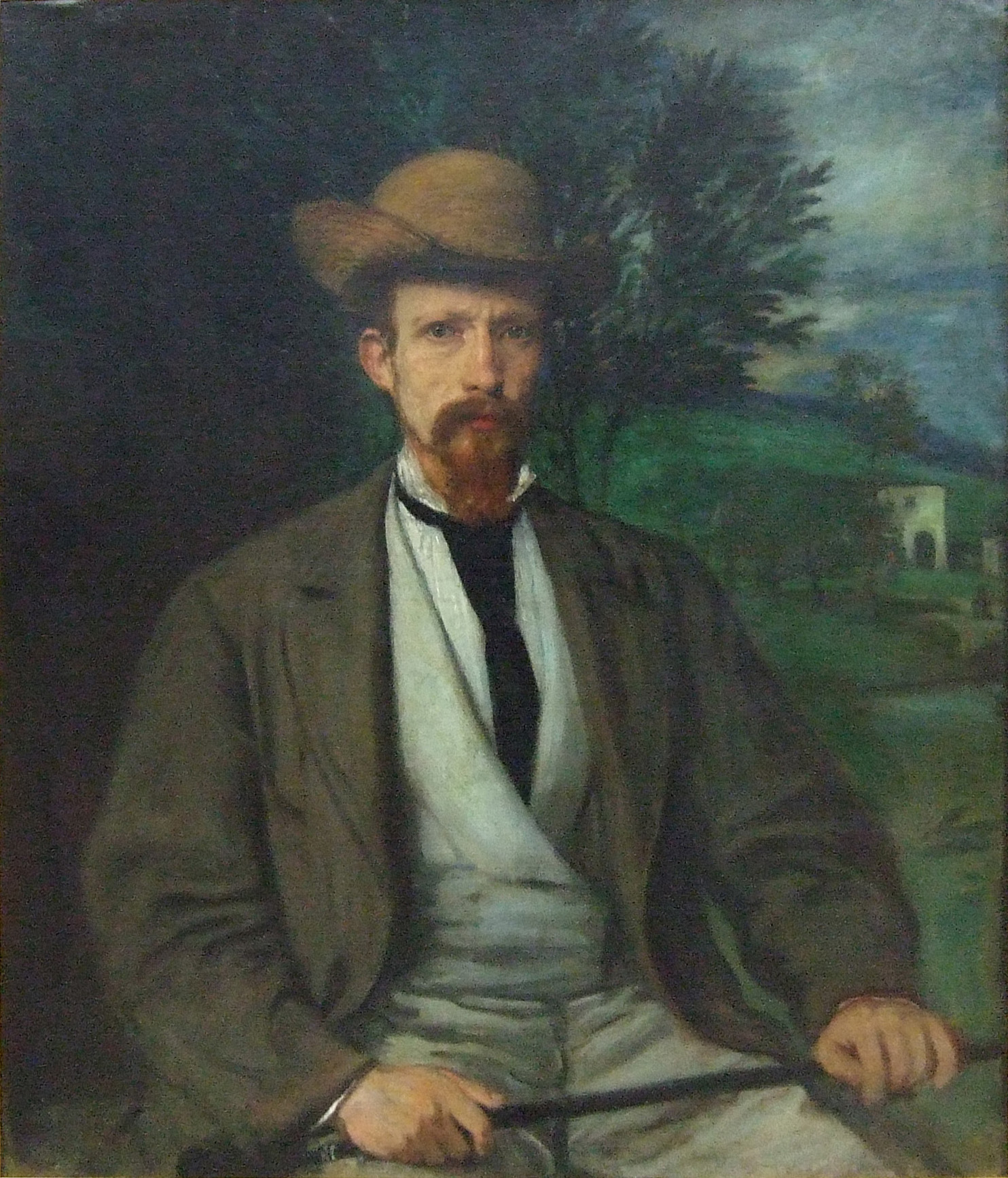
Hans von Marées:
Selbstbildnis mit gelbem Hut
Nationalgalerie Berlin

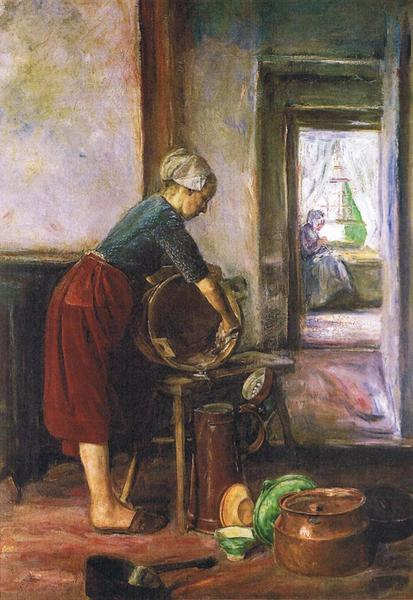
Max Liebermann:
In der Küche
Privatsammlung

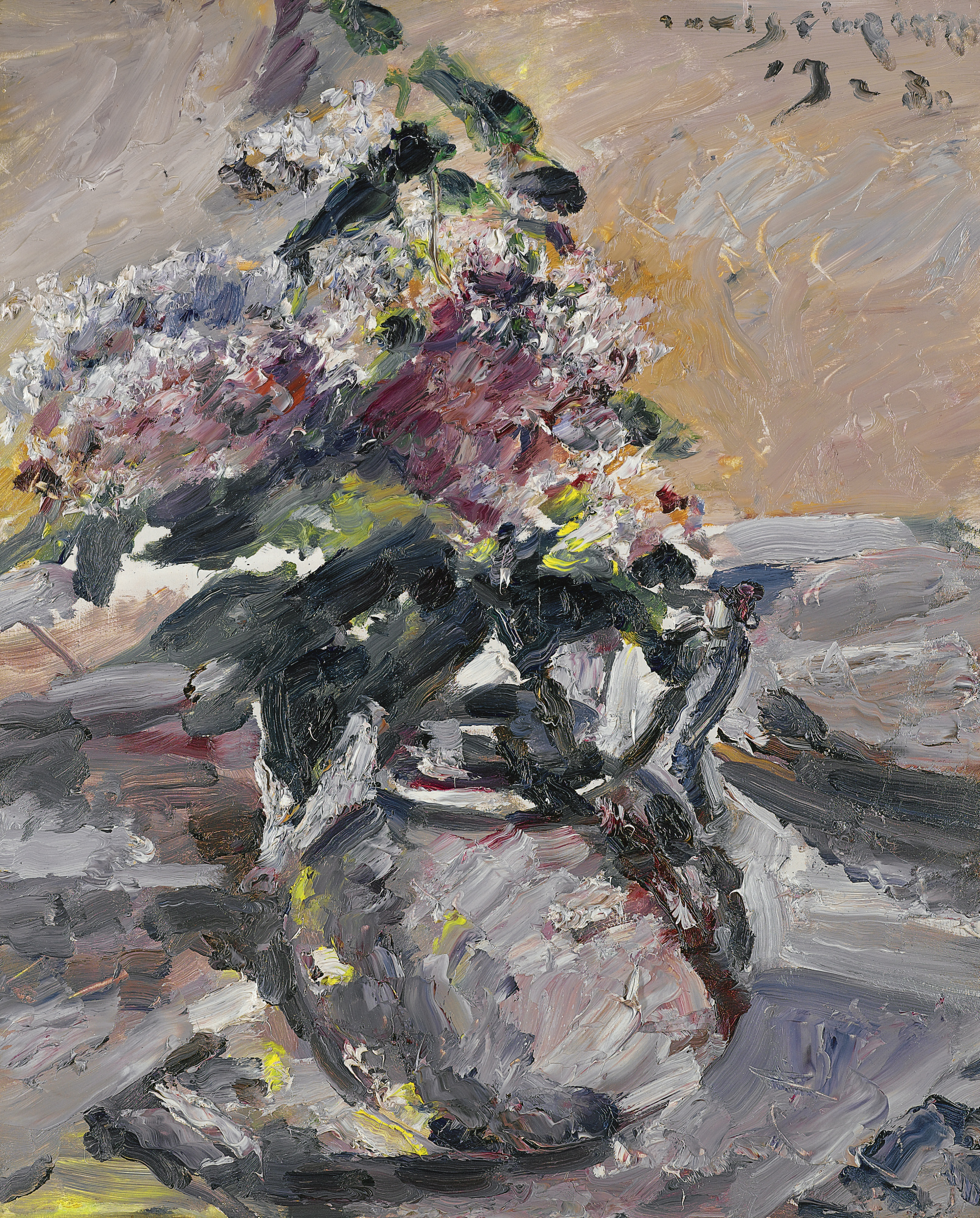
Lovis Corinth:
Flieder im Glaskrug
Privatsammlung

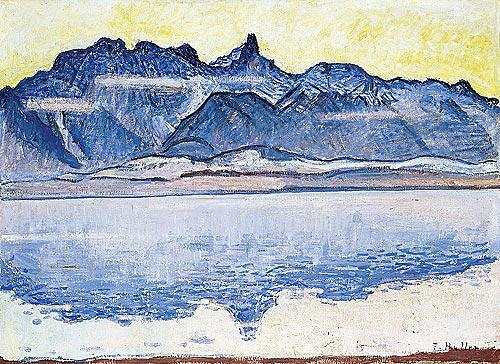
Ferdinand Hodler:
Stockhornkette mit Thunersee
Privatsammlung

The Silberberg Collection works of Realism and Impressionism included Algerian Women at the Well (now private property) and Odalisque resting on an ottoman (Fitzwilliam Museum) by Eugène Delacroix, and the works of Poetry by Jean-Baptiste Camille Corot (Wallraf-Richartz Museum) and Thatched Roof Hut in Normandy (Norton Simon Museum). Silberberg also collected works by Honoré Daumier, Adolphe Monticelli, Jean-François Millet and Gustave Courbet whose Grand Pont in currently in the Yale University Art Gallery, Reading Young Girl (National Gallery of Art) and The Rock in Hautepierre (Art Institute of Chicago).

Impressionist works included Pertuiset as a lion hunter (Museu de Arte de São Paulo) and Young Woman in Oriental Costume (Foundation EG Bührle Collection) by Édouard Manet and The Reading (Louvre), Little Girl with Hoops (National Gallery of Art) as well the privately owned pictures Laughing Girl, Gondola, Venice and Bouquet of Roses by Pierre-Auguste Renoir. The collector owned the paintings Boats on the Seine (private collection) and Snow in the Setting Sun (Musée des Beaux-Arts de Rouen) by Claude Monet. Other Impressionist works in this collection were The Seine at Saint-Mammès (private collection) by Alfred Sisley, Boulevard Montmartre, Spring 1897 (Israel Museum) and Path to Pontoise (Musée d'Orsay) by Camille Pissarro and Landscape with Chimneys (Art Institute of Chicago), La sortie du bain (Musée d'Orsay) and Ballet Dancers (private collection) by Edgar Degas.

Late Impressionist works in Silberberg's collection included the paintings Still Life with Apples and Napkin (Musée de l'Orangerie), Jas de Bouffan (private property) and Landscape in the Aix Area (Carnegie Museum of Art), as well as the drawing of a male's back view Nude (Hermitage) by Paul Cézanne. There was also Die Brücke von Trinquetaille, (private property) by Vincent van Gogh, of whom Silberberg also owned the drawing L’Olivette, works by Paul Signac as well as the cubist works Strand in Dieppe (Moderna Museet) and Still Life with Jug by Georges Braque, and works by Georges Seurat, Alexej von Jawlensky and Paul Klee.

He acquired the wooden sculpture Die Mourning by Ernst Barlach from the actress Tilla Durieux, featured at the entrance of the Silberberg house. Other works, mostly small bronzes, came from artists such as August Gaul, Auguste Rodin, Aristide Maillol, Constantin Meunier, Renée Sintenis and Henri Matisse.

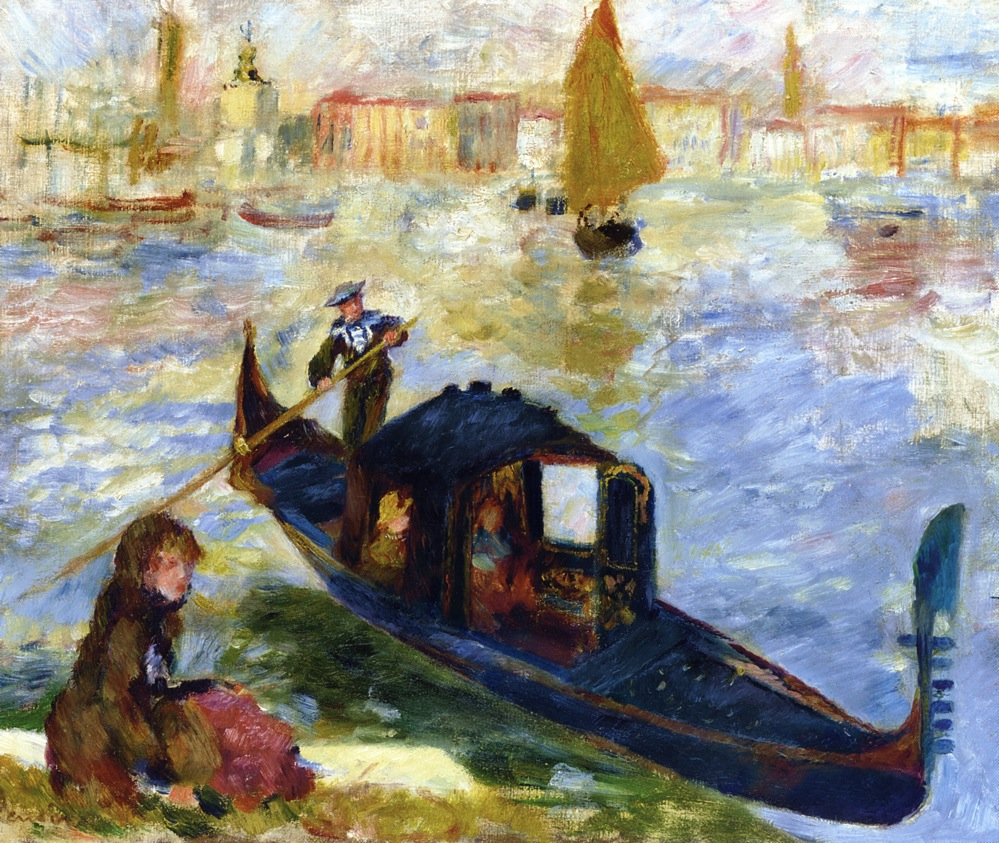
Pierre-August Renoir:
Gondola, Venise
Privatsammlung

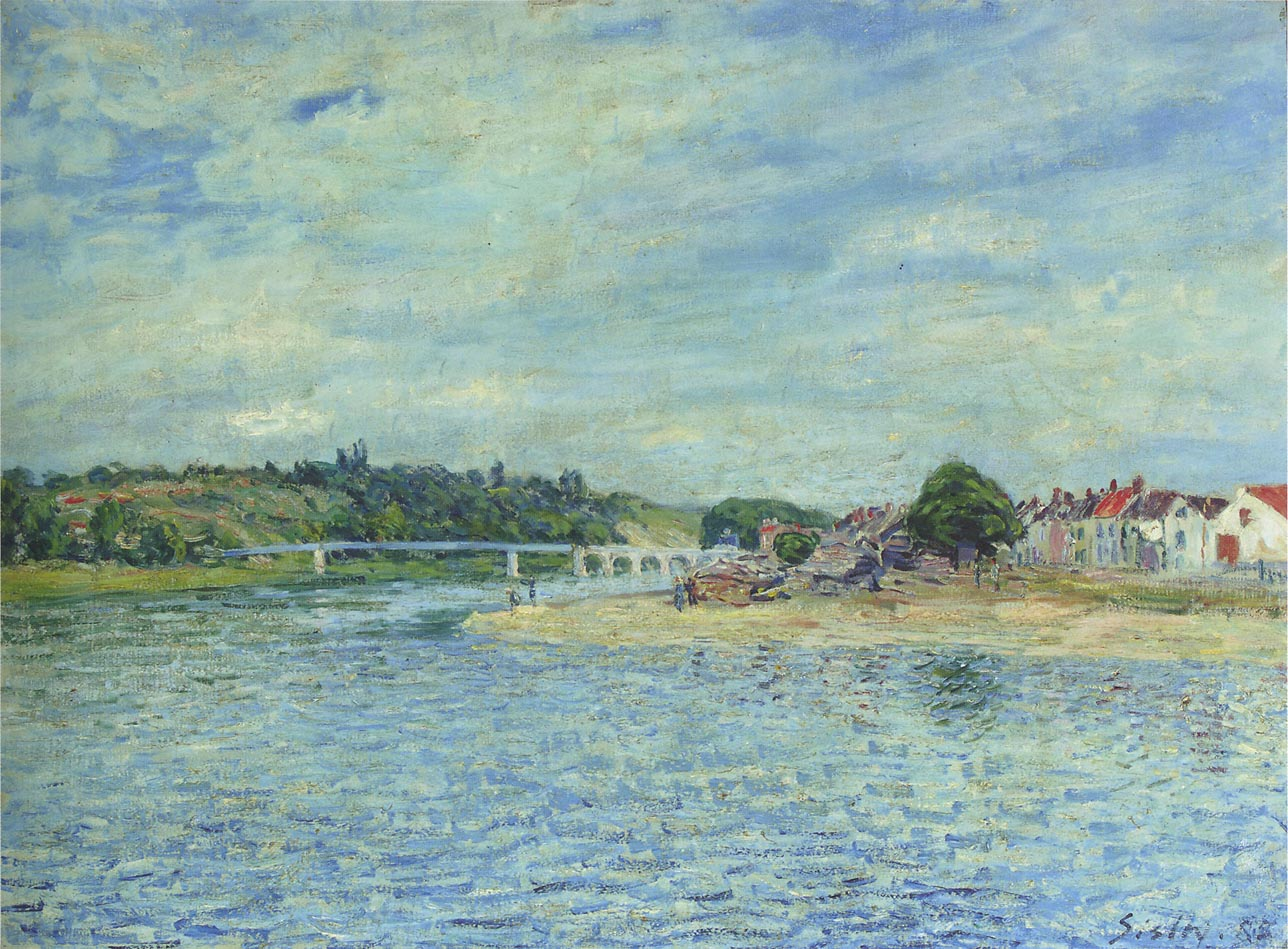
Alfred-Sisley:
La Seine à Saint-Mammès
Privatsammlung

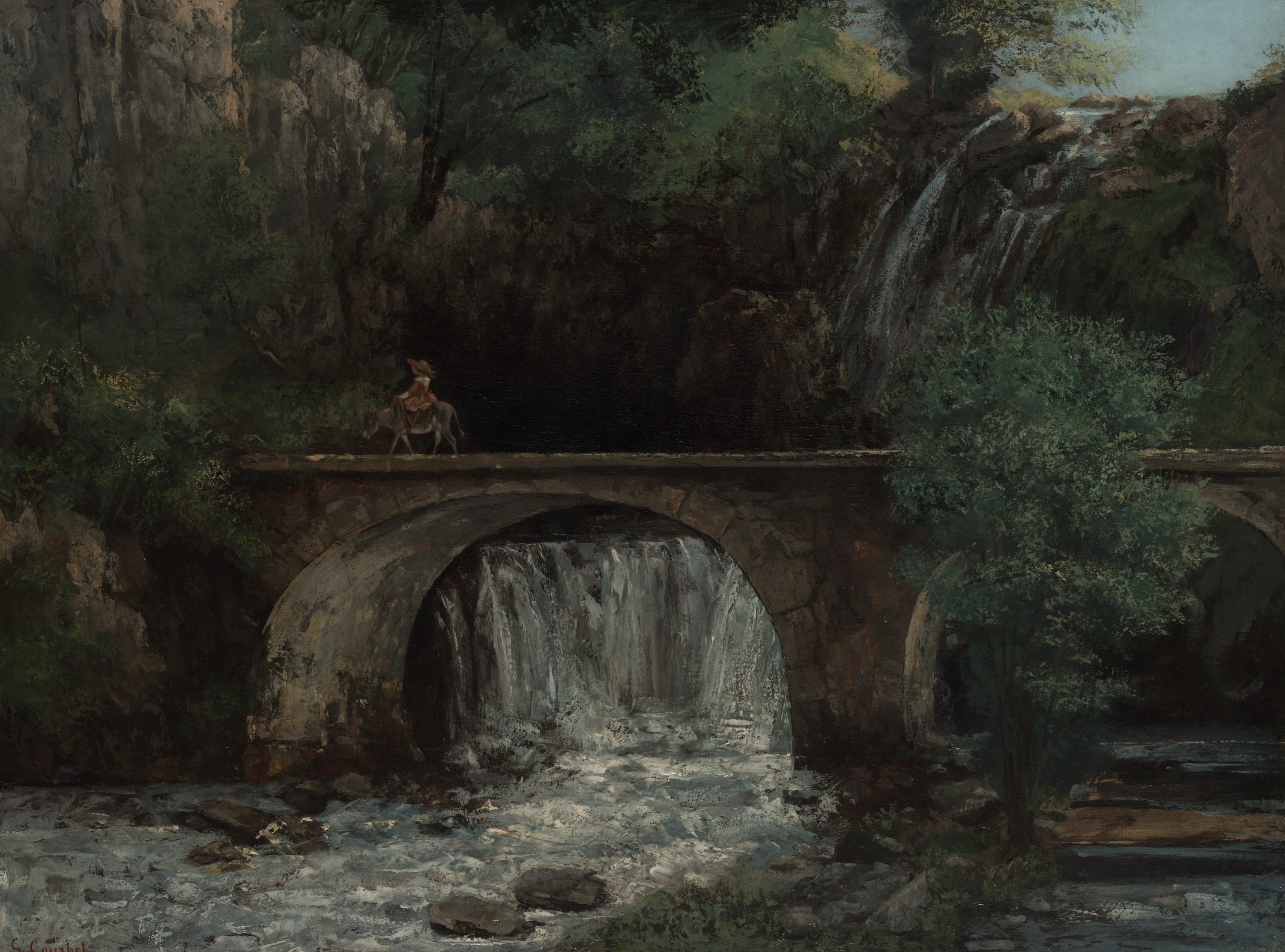
Gustave Courbet:
Le Grande Pont
Yale University Art Gallery, New Haven

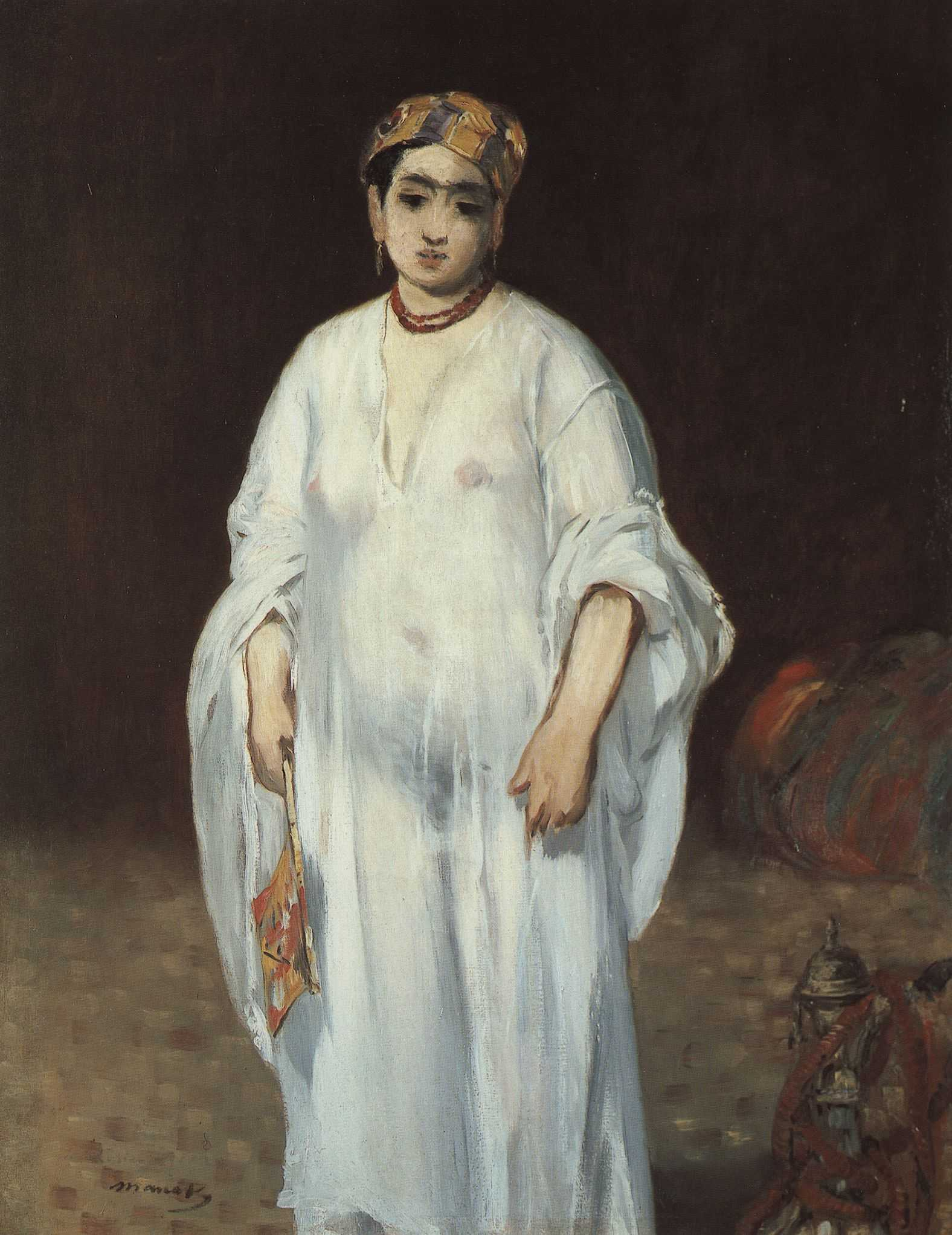
Édouard Manet:
Junge Frau im orientalischen Kostüm
Stiftung Sammlung E. G. Bührle, Zürich

== Restitution claims for Nazi looted art ==
After the Second World War, the heirs of Max Silberberg had great difficulties in asserting claims on their former property.

Breslau had become a Polish city and the files that could have documented the systematic expropriation of Silberberg's property were either destroyed or inaccessible to the heirs. While the Polish authorities refused to compensate former German property - for example, land - the German authorities did not see themselves as responsible. The former art possessions were scattered around the world through auctions and resales and their whereabouts were in most cases unknown. In addition, although allied law had generally recognized that “loss of property through sale” was also to be viewed as robbery, since the sale took place under the pressure of persecution, national regulations made it difficult or impossible to demand return. From the end of the 1960s, most of the claims were barred.

It was not until the Washington Conference on Holocaust Era Assets, held in Washington, D.C., United States, on 3 December 1998, that there was progress. After the death of Silberberg's son in 1984, the collector's daughter-in-law, Gerta Silberberg, managed to claim restitution for some works of art after 1998. Most of the collection is still considered lost.

=== Claims in Germany ===
In 2003 the Staatsgalerie Stuttgart restituted the painting Still Life with a Cane by Georges Braque to the Silberberg family. A settlement concerning Corot's painting Poetry was reached with the Wallraf-Richartz Museum in Cologne. The Berlin National Gallery which had acquired Hans von Marées' Husband with a Yellow Hat at the forced Graupe auction of 1935, restituted the painting to the Silberberg heir in July 1999 and then bought it back the same year. The Refreshment, also auctioned at Graup in 1935, was the subject of a settlement between the Wiesbaden Museum in 1980 and the Silberberg heirs. Vincent van Gogh's drawing Olive Trees in Front of the Alpilles Mountains, also auctioned at Graupe in 1935, was restituted to Greta Silberberg who later sold it. It had been acquired by the Association of Friends of the National Gallery and given to the Kupferstichkabinett. The Kupferstichkabinett also reached a settlement in 1999 concerning the drawing Woman with a shawl by Caspar David Friedrich, which Max Silberberg had to leave to the Breslau tax office in 1940 to settle alleged tax debts.

Artworks from the Silberberg collection have also been located in the Museum Georg Schäfer in Schweinfurt, including Market in Haarlem by Max Liebermann and Head of a Bavarian Girl with Inntaler Hat by Wilhelm Leibl. In 2020, a researcher hired by the museum to research the provenance of 1000 artworks, quit, telling the New York Times that she had found paintings looted from Jews, but that "no one seemed to have any plans to return them to the heirs of the original Jewish owners".

In 2014, Germany's Wiesbaden Museum attempted to draw attention to the problem of looted art by hanging Hans von Marees’ Die Labung facing the wall because it had been obtained due to a forced sale from the Silberberg collection under the Nazis.

=== Claims in Switzerland ===
The painting Stockhornkette mit Thunersee by Ferdinand Hodler, claimed by the Silberberg family, is in St. Gallen Art Museum on loan from St. Gallen government councilor Simon Frick, who purchased it from the Kornfeld Gallery in Bern According to the Swiss Independent Commission the provenance had been falsified to make it appear to have been from a different collection when it had in reality belonged to Max Silberberg. The Silberberg family also requested the restitution of Édouard Manet's painting Young Woman in an Oriental Costume (also La Sultane) from the Zurich E. G. Bührle Foundation which had purchased it from Paul Rosenberg The museum refused, asserting that it was not sold under duress. and suggesting on the museum's website that Silberberg may never have owned the painting at all.

The painting Sewing School in the Amsterdam Orphanage by Max Liebermann, was restituted to the Silberberg family by the Bündner Kunstmuseum.

=== Claims in the USA ===
Settlement agreements with the Silberberg heir were reached for the paintings The Rock in Hautepierre by Gustave Courbet in the Art Institute of Chicago which had acquired it from Paul Rosenberg in 1965, and Boulevard Montmartre, Spring (1897) by Camille Pissarro, in the Israel Museum in Jerusalem. In 2006, prior to the auctions at Sotheby's auction house, corresponding agreements were in place when the paintings Die Seine near Saint-Mammès by Alfred Sisley and Algerian Women at the Fountain by Eugène Delacroix changed hands.

Yale University Art Gallery received a claim for a Courbet which was sold at a forced auction at Paul Graupe.

=== Claims in France ===
A painting by Eugene Delacroix from the Silberberg collection entitled Women at a Fountain (Am Brunne) located in a private collection in France was restituted to the family and then auctioned at Sothebys in 2006. Represented by Monika Tatskow, the Silberberg family made a claim against the Orangerie Museum in Paris for the return of the painting by Cezanne, Still Life with Apples and Napkin (Fruits, serviette et boîte à lait).

=== United Kingdom ===
The Silberberg family also initiated a claim concerning rare secular Gothic ivory relief panel showing a man and woman playing chess with three figures looking over their shoulders held by the Ashmolean Museum in Oxford in the United Kingdom.The UK Spoliation Panel refused restitution, stating that the moral claim "is insufficiently strong to warrant a recommendation of restitution or the making of an ex-gratia payment. However, we do recommend the display alongside the Work, wherever it is, and in whatever medium, of an account of the history of the Work in the collection of its former owner during the Nazi era, and his tragic fate and that of his wife".

=== Russia ===
The Silberberg family entered into discussions with the Hermitage museum concerning a Cézanne from the Silberberg collection. The Berlin auctioneer Paul Graupe is listed as the previous owner, although this drawing was also acquired by the Nationalgalerie Berlin.

=== Poland ===
Poland has also so far refused restitution of artworks looted from Jews in the Holocaust.

== See also ==
- List of claims for restitution for Nazi-looted art
- Silesian Art Collections
- Nazi looting of artworks by Vincent van Gogh

== Literature ==
- Paul Abramowski: Die Sammlung Silberberg, Breslau. In Der Sammler – Deutsche Kunst- und Antiquitätenbörse, Nummer 20, Jahrgang 1930, S. 149–153.
- Alice Landsberg: Eine große deutsche Privatsammlung. Die Sammlung Silberberg in Breslau. In Die Dame – Illustrierte Mode-Zeitschrift, Nummer 16, Jahrgang (1930), S. 12–15.
- Karl Scheffler: Die Sammlung Max Silberberg. In Kunst und Künstler – Illustrierte Monatsschrift für bildende Kunst und Kunstgewerbe, Nummer 30, Jahrgang 1931, S. 3–18.
- Catalogue des tableaux, pastels, aquarelles, gouaches, dessins… provenant des collections étrangères de MM; S… et S. Katalog zur Auktion am 9. Juni 1932, Galerie Georges Petit, Paris 1932.
- Gemälde und Zeichnungen des 19. Jahrhunderts aus einer bekannten schlesischen Privatsammlung und aus verschiedenem Privatbesitz. Katalog zur Auktion am 23. März 1935, Auktionshaus Paul Graupe, Berlin 1935.
- Dorothea Kathmann: Kunstwerke aus jüdischen Sammlungen – Möglichkeiten und Grenzen der Provenienzermittlungen am Beispiel der Sammlung Silberberg aus Breslau In: Beiträge öffentlicher Einrichtungen der Bundesrepublik Deutschland zum Umgang mit Kulturgütern aus ehemaligem jüdischen Besitz, bearb. von Ulf Häder, Magdeburg 2001, ISBN 3-00-008868-7, S. 27–37.
- Anja Heuß: Die Sammlung Max Silberberg in Breslau. In Andrea Pophanken, Felix Billeter (Hrsg.): Die Moderne und ihre Sammler. Französische Kunst in deutschem Privatbesitz vom Kaiserreich zur Weimarer Republik. Akademie-Verlag, Berlin 2001, ISBN 3-05-003546-3, S. 311–325.
- Monika Tatzkow, Hans Joachim Hinz: Bürger, Opfer und die historische Gerechtigkeit. Das Schicksal jüdischer Kunstsammler in Breslau. In: Osteuropa, Nummer 56, Jahrgang 2006, S. 155–171.
- Marius Winzeler: Jüdische Sammler und Mäzene in Breslau. Von der Donation zur "Verwertung" ihres Kunstbesitzes. In: Andrea Baresel-Brand (Hrsg.): Sammeln, Stiften, Fördern. Jüdische Mäzene in der deutschen Gesellschaft. Koordinierungsstelle für Kulturgutverluste, Magdeburg 2008, ISBN 978-3-9811367-3-9, S. 131–156.
- Monika Tatzkow: Max Silberberg. In: Melissa Müller, Monika Tatzkow, Thomas Blubacher: Verlorene Bilder – verlorene Leben. Jüdische Sammler und was aus ihren Kunstwerken wurde. E. Sandmann Verlag, München 2009, ISBN 978-3-938045-30-5, S. 114ff.
