= Jewish art collectors in Breslau =

Jewish art collectors in Wroclaw existed in the Weimar Republic until Hitler's National Socialists came to power.

== The importance of Breslau collectors ==
According to Małgorzata Stolarska-Fronia, "Jewish art collectors became the predominant promoters of new trends in art." the Breslau Jewish collectors were Ismar Littmann, Carl Sachs, Max Silberberg, Schottländer, David Friedmann, Leo Smoschewer, Emil Kaim, Hugo Kolker, Leo Lewin as well as Öttinger."

Jewish art collectors in Wroclaw (Breslau) began to bring the first modernist works to the Silesian capital for exhibition, according to Marius Winzeler, who considered them "one of the great collectors of German". In 1923, Karl Scheffler emphasized their importance for Germany, writing:

Die Breslauer Sammlungen sind der Stadt, und unmittelbar dem Reich nicht wichtig, weil sie ein Besitz sind, der sich ziffernmäßig ausdrücken läßt, sondern weil sie geistige Spannungen erzeugen und dadurch zu Bewahrern dessen werden, woran uns heute mehr als an allem andern liegen muß.

== History ==
=== Jewish art collectors and philanthropists in Breslau ===
According to Winzeler, Breslau counted "an astonishing number of representatives of the up-and-coming Jewish bourgeoisie" in the Wroclaw art and cultural scene, such as the "Silesian Society for Patriotic Culture," in which Jewish members had held "prominent positions" since the 1850s and which played a key role in the creation of the Wroclaw Museum of Fine Arts.

In 1905 Breslau had 470,904 inhabitants and Jews were a significant part of the upper middle class there. During the Weimar Republic, Jewish art collectors in Breslau bought and exhibited mainly works of modern art. Marius Winzeler describes that Jewish collectors and patrons played "the most important role" for Wroclaw's art collections. The Jewish art collections entered the public museums of Wroclaw through municipal purchases and private donations.

From 1920 onwards, representatives of the upper Jewish bourgeoisie can be found in prominent positions in many associations and boards of trustees. Since 1921 there was the "Society of Friends of Art", which focused its interest especially on contemporary and modern art. The paintings acquired by the society were later loaned to the Museum of Fine Arts in Wroclaw, where they set "essential accents". Since March 1928, there was the Wroclaw Association "Jewish Museum", under the aegis of which Erwin Hintze organized the extraordinarily successful exhibition "History of the Jews in Silesia" in the Wroclaw Museum of Decorative Arts and Antiquities in 1929.

Jewish collectorship and patronage increased in the late 1920s and early 1930s and was only broken by the Nazi seizure of power.

Heinz Braune, director of the Silesian Museum of Fine Arts in Wroclaw from 1919 to 1928, received donations and support for the museum from several Jewish collectors including the then Breslau city theater director Dr. Theodor Loewe, with a second version of Bendemann's "Mourning Jews" and a female figure by Robert Bednorz. Carl Sachs donated a Tyrolean mountain landscape by Joseph Anton Koch, as well as a landscape sketch by the Wroclaw artist Hermann Völkerling. In 1930 Ismar Littmann donated two valuable etchings to the Silesian Museum of Fine Arts in Wroclaw. In November 1931 and May 1932, Carl Sachs donated valuable pieces from his collection to the Museum of Fine Arts in Breslau, including works by Emil Nolde, Käthe Kollwitz and Max Liebermann, some of which were later condemned by the Nazis as degenerate art and confiscated.

The Jewish art collectors of Breslau suffered "a long time of forgetting and concealment". However scholarly studies and restitution cases have revived their history.

=== Important Jewish collectors and philanthropists in Breslau ===
Małgorzata Stolarska-Fronia mentions five Jewish collectors in Wroclaw:

In this era, there were five major collectors of Jewish origin, who stand out from other active Breslau art enthusiasts due to the clearly profiled nature of their collections and their persistence in creating them. Leo Lewin, Carl Sachs, Max Silberberg and Ismar Littmann, as well as Leo Schmoschewer. All had different personalities but their main interests was modern art such as Impressionism and Expressionism.

Marius Winzeler also names Toni and Albert Neisser, Max Pinkus, and Otto Ollendorff as "protagonists of Jewish collectorship and patronage in Breslau".

Ramona Bräu also mentions the Jewish Breslau collectors Schottländer, David Friedmann and Öttinger..

According to Winzeler, the list of Jewish art collections and collectors of Jewish origin remains incomplete.

Leider können bislang zu vielen überlieferten Namen aus der jüdischen Kultur- und Kunstzene im Breslau der Zwischenkriegszeit keine näheren Aussagen und Angaben gemacht werden, weshalb eine umfassende Darstellung des Sammlerwesens und Mäzenatentums noch nicht möglich ist

— Winzeler: Jüdische Sammler und Mäzene in Breslau … 2006, S. 137

jüdische Sammler in Breslau

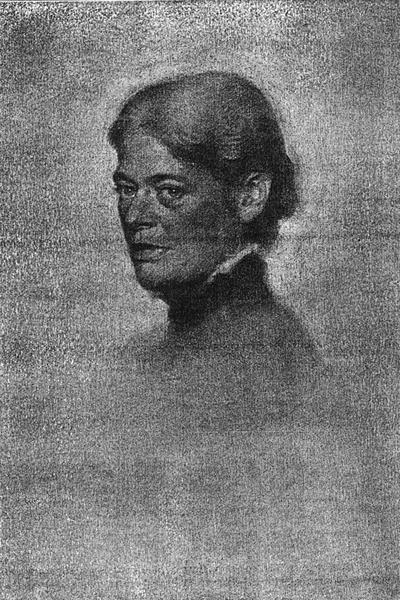
Toni Neisser (Fritz Erler)

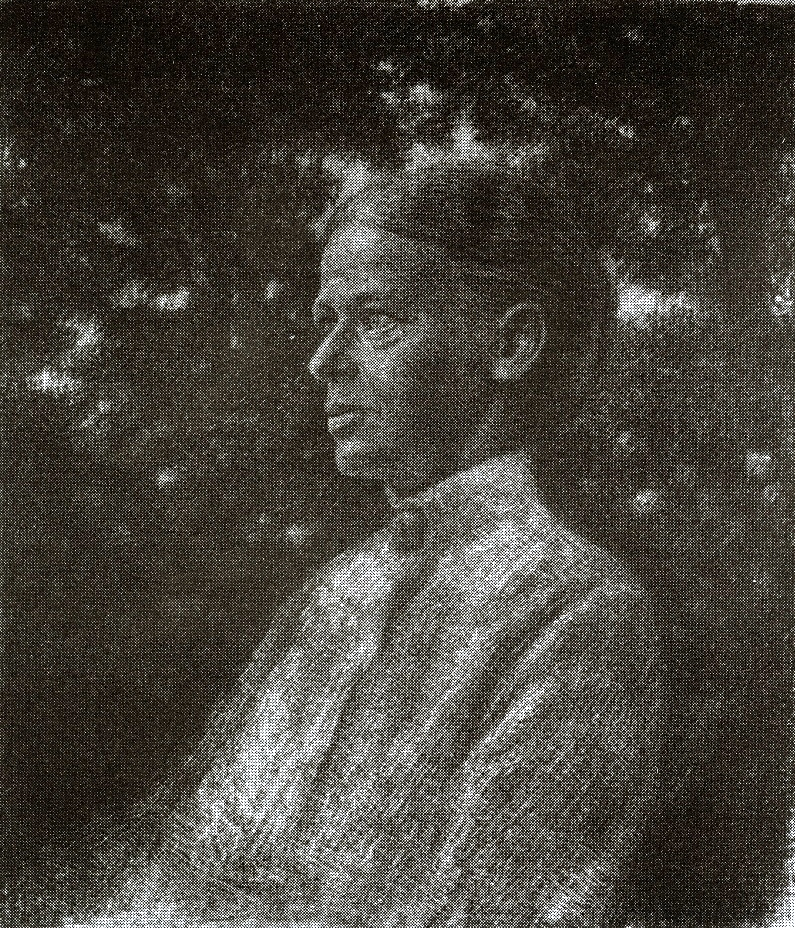
Toni Neisser (Alfred Graetzer)

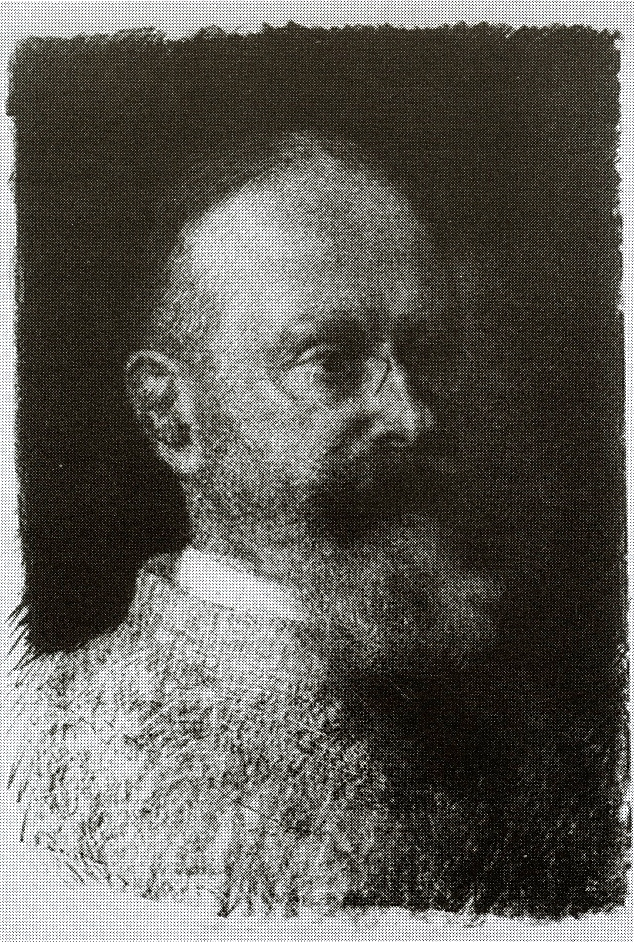
Albert Neisser (Alfred Graetzer)

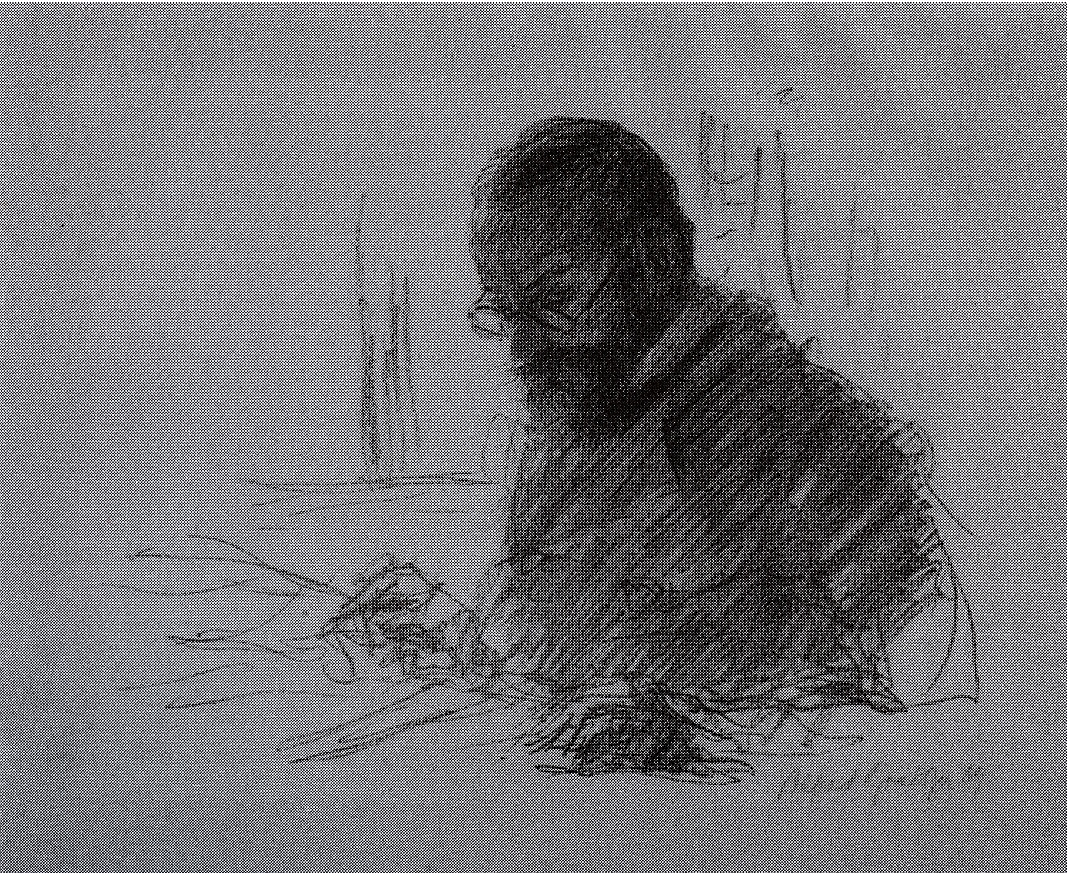
Albert Neisser (Alfred Graetzer)

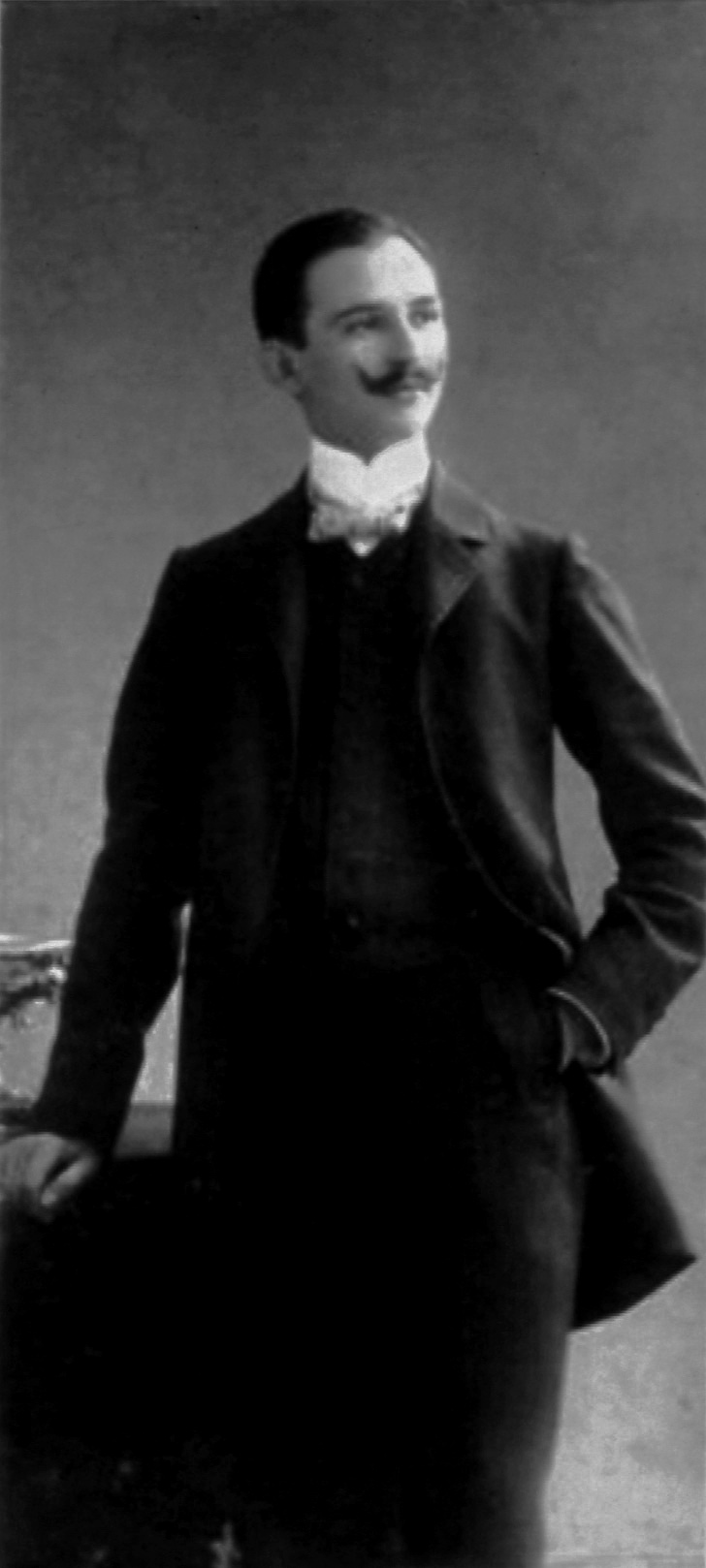
Ismar Littmann (1910)

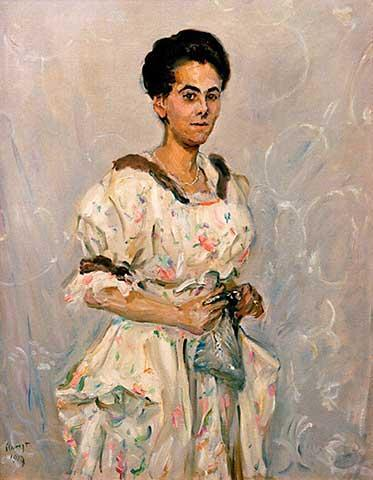
Porträt v. Helen Lewin (Max Slevogt)

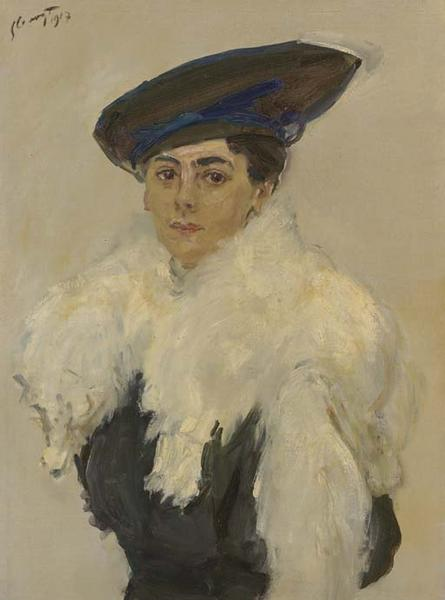
Porträt v. Helen Lewin (Max Slevogt)

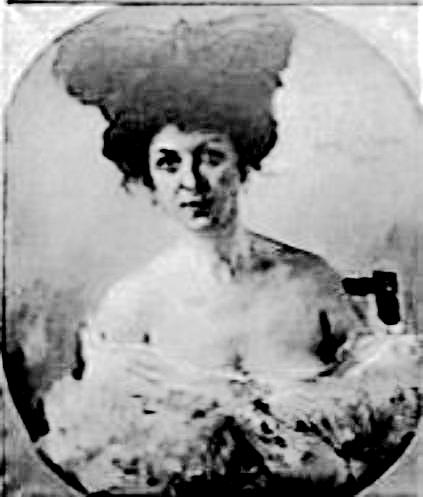
Lovis Corinth, Porträt der Elise Smoschewer, 1906

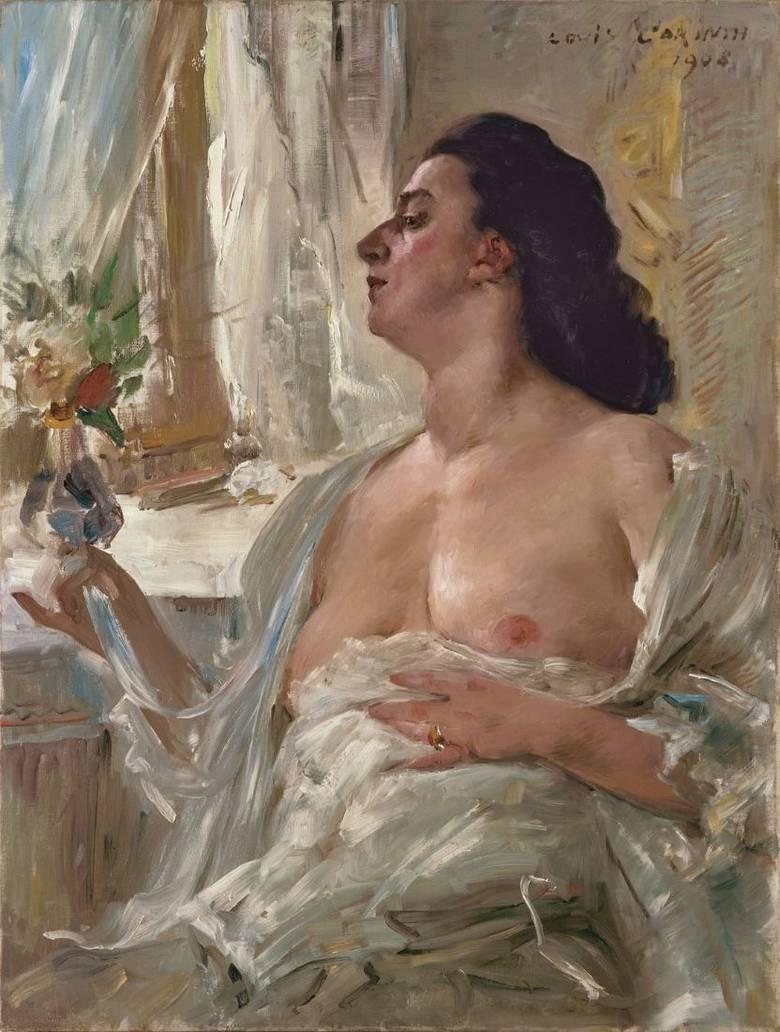
Lovis Corinth, Porträt der Elise Smoschewer, 1908

=== Type of collectors and philanthropists ===
In the case of the Neisser couple, the creation of Villa Neisser as a "cultural center[...]"' was at the center of their activities, as well as the "establishment of a cultural memorial". However, this was not the case for the collectors Lewin, Sachs and Silberberg. For them, the private enjoyment of art and the collecting of artworks by leading contemporary artists represented a balance to their work. The selection of artworks was an expression of their "self-image as modern cosmopolitans. They were particularly interested in the masterpieces presented by the leading galleries in Berlin and Paris. Thus they ranked themselves among the "great collectors of Germany". Karl Scheffler paid detailed tribute to the three collections (Lewin, Sachs, and Silberberg) in 1923, saying.:

Die Breslauer Sammlungen sind der Stadt, und unmittelbar dem Reich nicht wichtig, weil sie ein Besitz sind, der sich ziffernmäßig ausdrücken läßt, sondern weil sie geistige Spannungen erzeugen und dadurch zu Bewahrern dessen werden, woran uns heute mehr als an allem andern liegen muß

— Karl Scheffler: Breslauer Kunstleben. In: Kunst und Künstler. 1923, S. 133.

== Nazi era persecution 1933-1945 ==
When the Nazis come to power, Jewish art collectors were forced from their positions, plundered and murdered. Erich Wiese - Heinz Braune's successor as museum director - was a representative of modern art and was therefore dismissed by the National Socialists on June 23, 1933. In 1934 art historian Cornelius Müller Hofstede, became museum director and "decisively and actively pursued the recovery of formerly Jewish art possessions." In 1933, Jewish members were already removed from the lists of trustees of the Wroclaw Museum and dismissed from the board of the Friends of Art. After Jewish businesses were aryanized and many were also banned from their professions, the Jewish middle class lost its livelihood and Jewish art patrons were deported, had to emigrate or died shortly afterwards. Max Pinkus died in June 1934, Ismar Littmann committed suicide in October 1934, Leo Smoschewer died in 1938 and his wife committed suicide in May 1939. Max Silberberg was deported to the Theresienstadt concentration camp in 1942 and later to the Auschwitz concentration camp, where he perished.

=== Aryanisation of Jewish art collections ===
After the Jewish art collectors had been murdered, been deported, committed suicide or emigrated, their art collections were transferred to Silesian museums. "Cornelius Müller Hofstede and his colleague Sigfried Asche took possession of many Jewish art assets, with the objective of integrating them into two most important Silesian museums in Breslau and Görlitz. The employees of the Museum of Fine Arts in Wroclaw sifted through the Sachs, Silberberg and Smoschewer collections for art possessions of interest to the museum and drew up an overview of the pieces to be considered, and prepared a list with a total of 84 works of art from the Sachs, Silberberg and Schmoschewer collections.

In 1935, Leo Lewin was forced by political and economic constraints to sell his collection to Max Perl in Berlin.

In July 1940, the President of the Breslau Government handed over to the Silesian Museum of Fine Arts a total of eleven works of art from the Sachs Collection, including works by Schuch, Slevogt, Thoma and Teniers, worth 14,900 Reichsmarks from the Sachs Collection..

On January 30, 1940, Max Silberberg was forced to hand over his immense art treasure to the Breslau-Süd tax office. A large part of Silberberg's art treasure was in storage at the Museum of Fine Arts in Wroclaw. Many others were still interested in the immense Jewish art treasure and - "the race for the most valuable pieces began". The Aryanization Commissioner, Regierungsrat von Natzmer, expressed his desire to purchase a small bronze from the Jewish art collection to the museum director, Müller Hofstede. The museum then waived its right of first refusal and handed over the valuable sculpture from Jewish ownership to the Aryanization Commissioner. On July 5, 1941, Müller Hofstede attempted in a letter to the Breslau government to allocate the more valuable part of the Jewish art treasure to the Breslau Museum of Fine Arts free of charge. However, the Chief Finance President of Lower Silesia successfully objected to this on March 26, 1942, to the Breslau Government President.

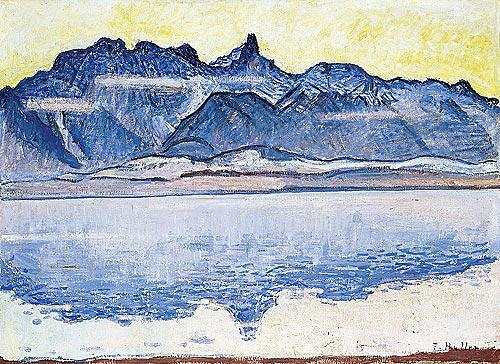
Ferdinand Hodler: Stockhornkette mit Thunersee

The wholesale business in colonial goods (Hummerei No. 28) of Wilhelm Perhöfter was aryanized on April 2, 1938. and Wilhelm were taken to Buchenwald concentration camp immediately after the November pogrom in 1938.

The family approached Professor Hertel (head of the Kunstkammer for Silesia) as part of the household liquidation and hoped to obtain an export license for the art collection. Helene Perlhöfter knew to report that "Professor Hertel [was] a glass expert himself and [knew] our collection exactly. He demanded that the museum directors first be given the opportunity to select suitable pieces from the collection. The museum directors then came to us and selected a number of pieces that interested them. For all the rest we received [...] a certificate that it was not of interest for German cultural purposes".

=== Whereabouts of the art collections and restitution to heirs in the post-war period (from 1945) ===
Today's National Museum in Wrocław ([Muzeum Narodowe we Wrocławiu) has little to indicate donations and the "Jewish patronage of the interwar period." 10 drawings and 105 prints from the donation of Carl Sachs or the painting by Carl Schuch, dedicated to the museum by Silberberg in 1920 and forcibly transferred in 1939. In the depots of the Warsaw Museum are stored works that were taken over by Müller Hofstede from the expropriated remaining collections Kaim, Sachs, Silberberg and Schmoschewer.

Artworks formerly owned by Jewish Breslau collectors have appeared in museums and private collections in Germany, Austria, Switzerland, Israel and the USA

Aber all dies Wissen ermöglicht doch nur eine schwache Vorstellung von der Fülle und Qualität, die den hohen Rang der Breslauer Sammlungen ausmachten.

A few artworks from the Sachs, Silberberg, Smoschever and Littmann collections were restituted. The Municipal Collections in Görlitz restituted seven works of art to the heirs of the former owners Sachs, Smoschever and Ollendorff (Woman with Lilies in a Greenhouse). In addition, three objects that had belonged to Max Pinkus. The remaining paintings, sculptures and works of fine art, which were proven to be Jewish property, had not been returned in the post-war period from their storage locations, which had become Polish in the meantime. Together with the rest of the items that had been removed from storage - 80% of the collection in Görlitz had been removed from storage - they had been taken by the Polish authorities to other collection centers. The most important Jewish art objects from Breslau thus ended up in state museums in Warsaw, Krakow and others. Other paintings later appeared in the art trade and changed owners. For example, in the 1990s the painting from the Carl Sachs Collection, the female portrait created by Wilhelm Trübner in 1874 was offered in a Berlin gallery.

There have been lawsuits and court battles over contested ownership.

- Annerose Klammt, Marius Winzeler: "Die Moderne deutsche Kunst musste zur Geltung gebracht werden" – Zur Erwerbung von Kunstwerken aus jüdischem Eigentum für die Kunstsammlungen in Görlitz. In: Ulf Häder (Hrsg.): Beiträge öffentlicher Einrichtungen der Bundesrepublik Deutschland zum Umgang mit Kulturgütern aus ehemaligen jüdischen Besitz. Magdeburg 2001, ISBN 3-00-008868-7, S. 119–141.
- Marius Winzeler: Jüdische Sammler und Mäzene in Breslau – von der Donation zur "Verwertung" ihres Kunstbesitzes. In: Andrea Baresel-Brand, Peter Müller (Red.): Sammeln. Stiften. Fördern. Jüdische Mäzene in der deutschen Gesellschaft. Koordinierungsstelle für Kulturgutverluste, Magdeburg 2006, ISBN 3-9811367-3-X, S. 131–150.
- Ramona Bräu: "Arisierung" in Breslau – Die "Entjudung" einer deutschen Großstadt und deren Entdeckung im polnischen Erinnerungsdiskurs. VDM Verlag Dr. Müller, Saarbrücken 2008, ISBN 978-3-8364-5958-7, S. 77ff. (3.4.2 Die großen jüdischen Kunstsammlungen in Schlesien – Kunstraub.)
- Małgorzata Stolarska-Fronia: Udział środowisk Żydów wrocławskich w artystycznym i kulturalnym życiu miasta od emancypacji do 1933 roku. Wydawnictwo Neriton, Warszawa 2008, ISBN 978-83-7543-041-7. (abstract)
- Małgorzata Stolarska-Fronia: Jewish art collectors from Breslau and their impact on the city's cultural life at the end of the 19th and the beginning of the 20th century. In: Annette Weber (Hrsg.): Jüdische Sammler und ihr Beitrag zur Kultur der Moderne. Winter, Heidelberg 2011, ISBN 978-3-8253-5907-2, S. 237–253.
