= Paul Graupe =

German antiquarian book seller and art dealer

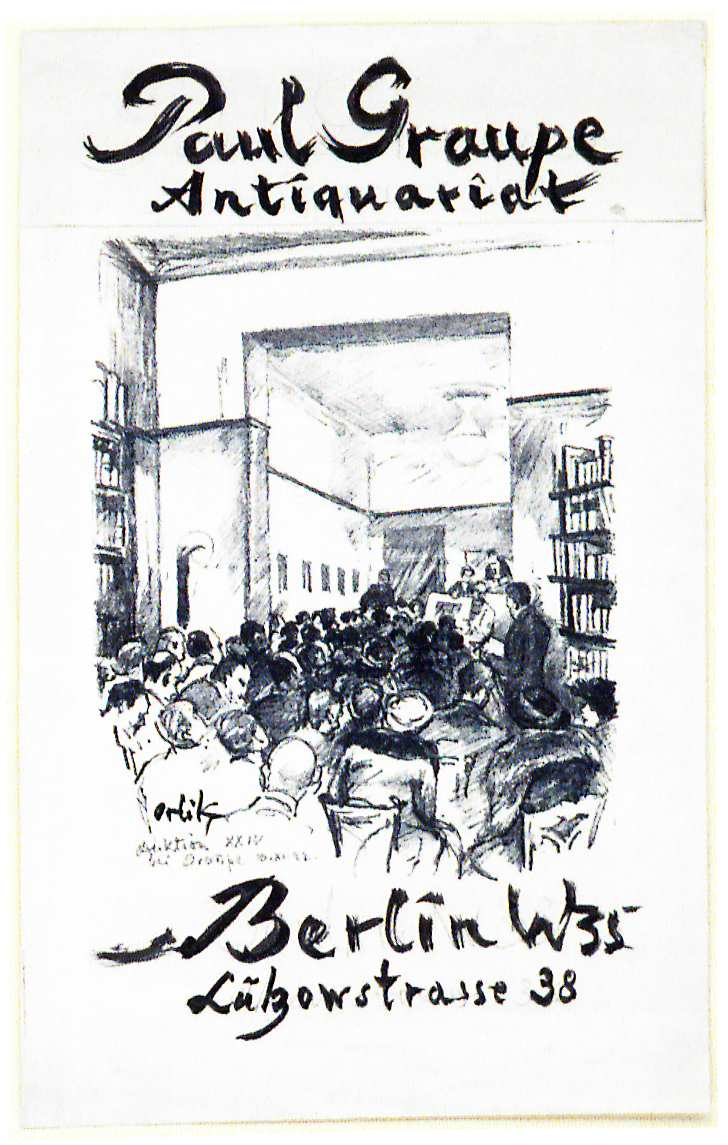
Emil Orlik:Poster for the 24th auction at Graupe 1922

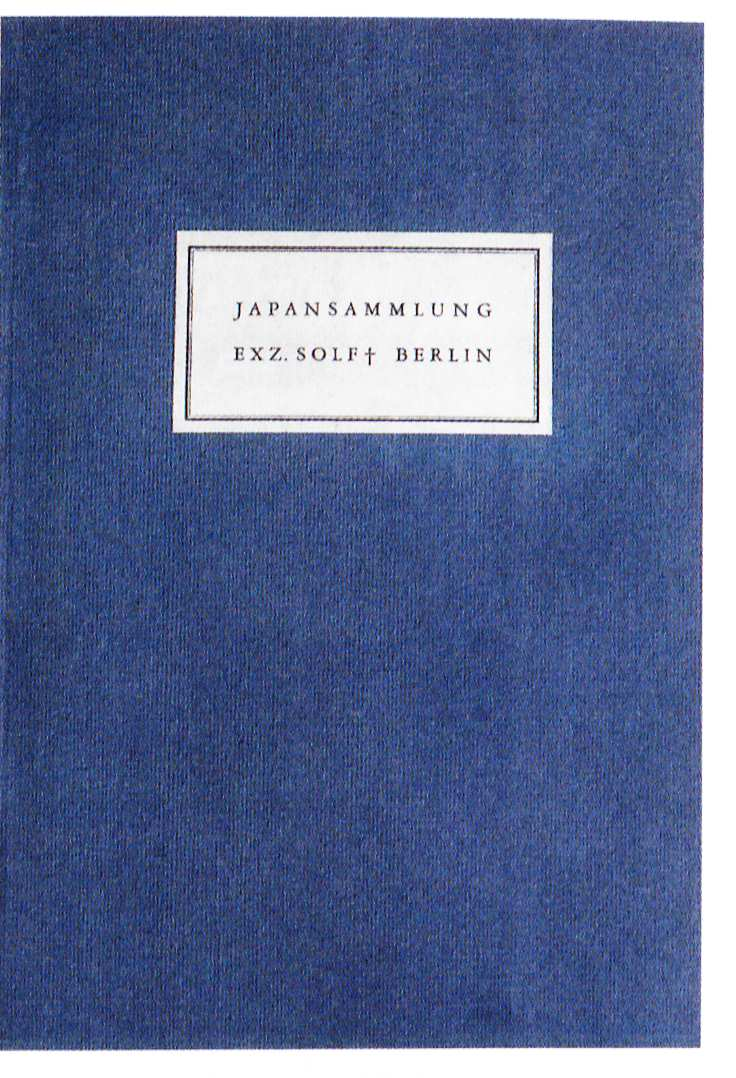
Company blueAuction catalog for Wilhelm Solf's Japan collection (1936)

Paul Graupe (May 29, 1881, in Neutrebbin – February 9, 1953, in Baden-Baden) was a German antiquarian bookseller and art dealer.

== Early life ==
Paul Graupe was born in 1881 into a Jewish family in Neutrebbin, Germany. He attended grammar school and apprenticed as a bookseller in Posen in the firm of Joseph Jolowicz. He then worked for Gustav Fock in Leipzig, Jacques Rosenthal in Munich, Martin Breslauer in Berlin, Lipsius & Tischer in Kiel and Friedrich Cohen in Bonn.

Graupe founded an antiquarian bookshop under his name in Berlin by 1902. Graupe was exempt from military service as an ineligible person in the First World War. In 1916 he held his first book auction in Berlin, and in 1917 he auctioned off the library of the late publisher and co-founder of Insel-Verlag Alfred Walter Heymel, including dedication copies of Rainer Maria Rilke.

After the First World War, Graupe helped organise the replacement of the holdings of the University Library of Louvain, which had been destroyed in World War I, alongside Joseph Baer & Co, Jacques Rosenthal, Ludwig Rosenthal, Karl Wilhelm Hiersemann and Martin Breslauer. Book art and graphic art were the main focus of his business until 1927. He also published auction catalogs. He expanded his business to include fine art and, between 1930 and 1932, held seventeen major art auctions in partnership with Kunsthandlung Hermann Ball.

== Nazi era ==
Paul Graupe's activities during the Nazi era have been described as "between and gray areas, to the genesis and networks of the Nazi art trade". When the Nazis (National Socialists) came to power in 1933, many Jewish art dealers like Alfred Flechtheim had to flee after their galleries were Aryanized, that is transferred to non-Jews. However, Graupe received special permission from the Nazi Reich Chamber of Culture to continue art dealing and auctions until 1937. Since he had an international clientele, Joseph Goebbels considered him a foreign exchange earner.

Graupe was involved in the liquidation of numerous art collections, such as that of Max Alsberg, who committed suicide in 1933. Nazi persecution of Jews included the seizure of assets and the imposition of special taxes like the Reich Flight Tax. In January 1934 Max Alsberg's art collection was auctioned off by Graupe. In 1935, Max Silberberg's extensive picture collection and library were sold off at Graupe.Rosa Oppenheimer's collection was sold in a forced auction in 1935. Other Jewish collections which passed through Graupe in the Nazi era include Oscar Wassermann, van Dieman, Emma Budge and Leo Lewin.

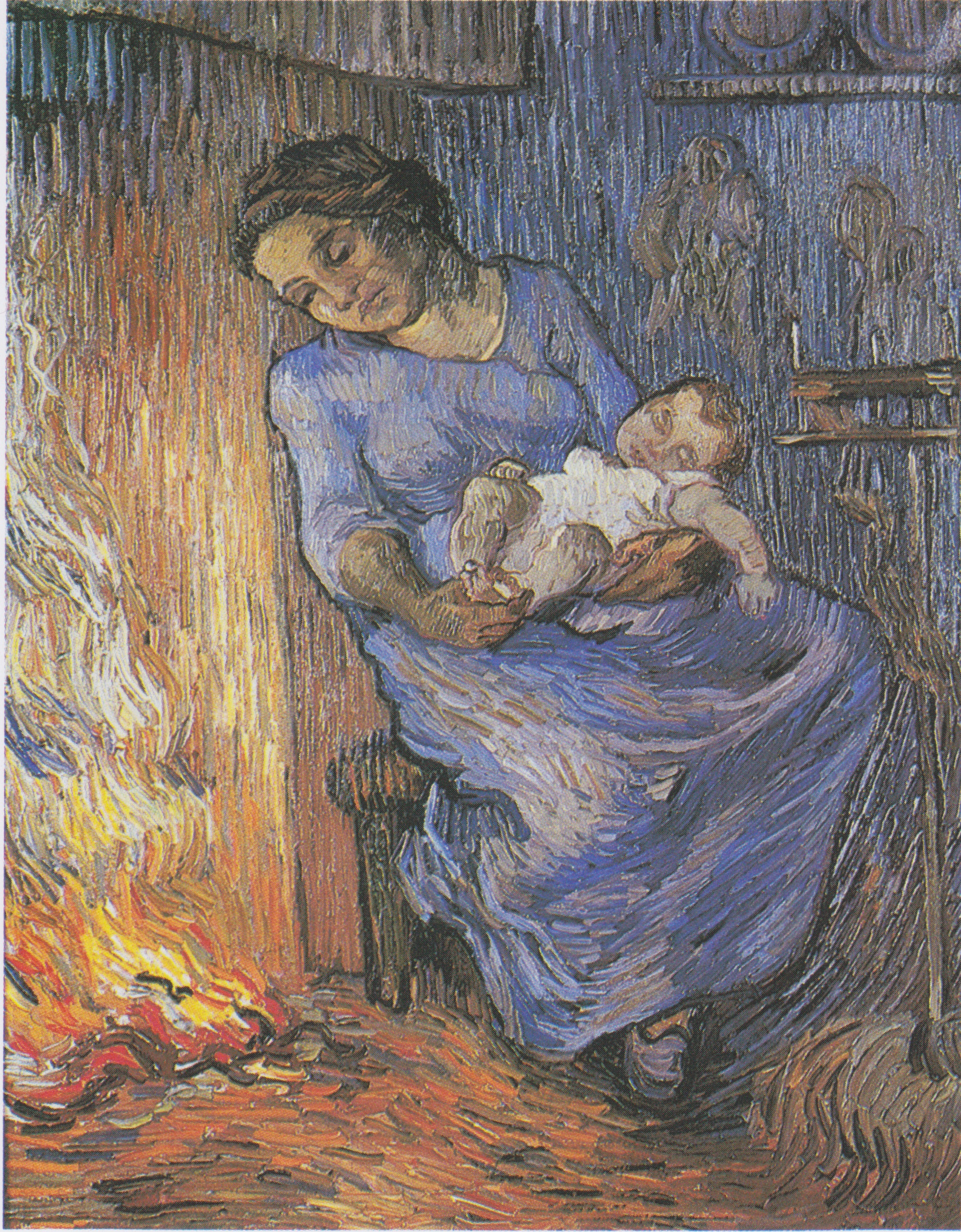
Van Gogh: Der Mann ist auf See

By 1937 Graupe had organized about 160 auctions with works by Rubens, Rembrandt or Tiepolo, Corot, Menzel and Liebermann, when he himself had to flee to Switzerland, the business in Berlin was aryanized, that is, transferred to a non-Jewish owner, Hans Wolfgang Lange (1904–1945) and continued until 1944.

Graupe founded the company "Paul Graupe & Cie" in Paris, but had no permission to work as an auctioneer in France. From 1936 he ran his Paris business in partnership with Arthur Goldschmidt. At the beginning of the war in 1939, he escaped internment in France because he was in Switzerland. The company's warehouse in Paris was looted by Einsatzstab Reichsleiter Rosenberg after the German invasion of France in 1940. Graupe managed to escape with his wife to the US in 1941, where he had great difficulty in doing business. Only the painting "The Man is at Sea" by Vincent van Gogh could be smuggled out of occupied France, and Graupe sold it to Errol Flynn.

His activities were investigated by the Art Looting Intelligence Unit in 1945 and 1946, and Graupe was put on the Red Flag List.

After the end of the war, he returned to Paris in 1945 and resumed business there. He endeavored to restitute the looted stocks, although it was later impossible to reconstruct which paintings Graupe owned and which his firm had taken on commission. Graupe fell seriously ill in 1950 and died in 1953. His son Tommy Grange was also an art dealer and continued to conduct research, restitution and compensation negotiations for the family until the 1960s.

== Controversial artworks and transactions ==
“Meules de Blé” by Vincent van Gogh, which Max Meirowsky entrusted to Paul Graupe in 1938 as he fled Nazi persecution was later the subject of restitution claims from both the Meirowsky and Alexandrine de Rothschild's heirs.

Herbert Max Magnus Gutmann (1879–1942) submitted claims for artworks auctioned at Graupe (2.p14. April 1934 Graupe Auction Nr. 132, Lot 17, in Berlin)

In 2017 the Oetker company reached a settlement with heirs of Emma Budge for a 17th-century silver cup in the shape of a windmill that was sold via the Paul Graupe auction house in 1937

Auktion Paul Graupe, Berlin Verst. No. 137 25./26.1.35 No. 110

There are many provenance research projects concerning Graupe's activities.

== Auction catalogs (selection) ==
- Bibliothek Paul Schlenther. Versteigerung am Sonnabend, den 5. Mai 1917. Einführung: Otto Pniower. Graupe, Berlin 1917.
- Otto von Falke: Sammlung Marc Rosenberg: Versteigerung 4. November 1929. Hermann Ball/Paul Graupe, Berlin 1929.
- Gemälde und Zeichnungen des 19. Jahrhunderts aus einer bekannten schlesischen Privatsammlung und aus verschiedenem Privatbesitz. Katalog zur Auktion am 23. März 1935, Auktionshaus Paul Graupe, Berlin 1935.

== Literature ==
- Patrick Golenia, Kristina Kratz-Kessemeier, Isabelle le Masne de Chermont: Paul Graupe (1881–1953). Ein Berliner Kunsthändler zwischen Republik, Nationalsozialismus und Exil. Böhlau, Köln 2016, ISBN 978-3-412-22515-5
- Paul Graupe (1881–1953), Antiquar und Kunsthändler. In: Aus dem Antiquariat Bd. NF 14, 2016, Nr. 2, S. 103–105
- Anja Heuß: Paul Graupe (1881–1953). Ein Berliner Kunsthändler zwischen Republik, Nationalsozialismus und Exil. Rezension, in: Informationsmittel für Bibliotheken (IfB), PDF.
