= Leo Smoschewer =

German Jewish art collector

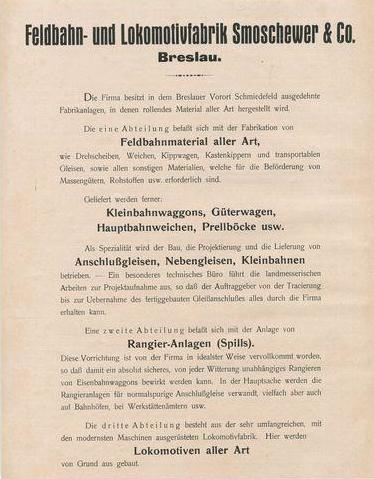
Feldbahn- und Lokomotivfabrik Smoschewer & Co., Breslau (advertisement, 1923)

Leo Smoschewer (March 11, 1875 – July 15, 1938, in Breslau) was a German Jewish mechanical engineering entrepreneur and art collector whose business was Aryanized and art collection seized by the Nazis.

== Early life ==
Leo Smoschewer was a son of Emanuel Smoschewer, a grain wholesaler who came to Breslau from Krotoschin, and his wife Henriette Smoschewer née Reich. Smoschewer married Elise, and they lived together in a villa at Lindenallee 12 in Breslau.

On March 21, 1911, Smoschewer joined the Gesellschaft der Brüder (Society of Brothers). The family belonged to the Breslau synagogue community, and Leo Smoschewer served on the community board from 1927.

Leo Smoschewer was a co-owner of Smoschewer & Co. in Breslau, a company founded in 1899 which manufactured locomotives and wagons for light railroads, road rollers and other machinery. The company had branches in Berlin, Gdansk and Prague, as well as in Romania. Smoschewer had been Romanian consul general in Wroclaw since 1924. In the same year, he was also appointed honorary senator of the Technical University of Wroclaw.

== Business ==
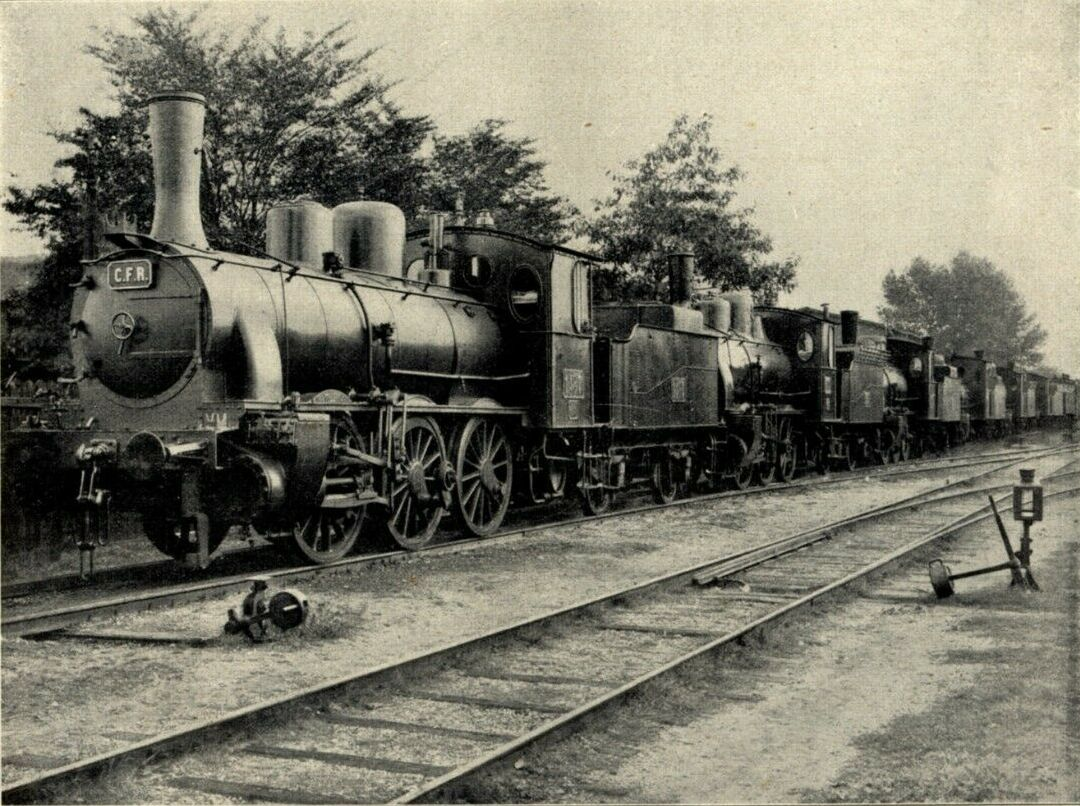
A train of locomotives from Feldbahn- und Lokomotivfabrik Smoschewer & Co, Breslau leaves the factory (1923).

Since 1899, the company Feldhahn-Industrie Smoschewer & Co, located at Kaiser Wilhelmstraße 48–50 in Breslau, was engaged in the manufacture and sale of all materials used for the construction and installation of railroad equipment in the broadest sense. Around 1923, the company manufactured all kinds of light railway materials, such as switches, turntables, tipping wagons, special wagons and all other accessories for light railroads.

The company specialized in light railway operation on farms and supplied all rail material with accessories for the execution of earthworks, for the equipment of small railroads, main railroads, standard-gauge sidings, and also had a special technical office for the design of small and branch railroads. It manufactured locomotives in the Wroclaw suburb of Schmiedefeld, both for construction companies and for industrial railroads, for standard-gauge sidings, for small public railroads, state railroads, etc. It also designed small railroads and branch lines. A particular specialty was the production of small railway locomotives and shunting locomotives as well as fireless locomotives. The locomotive factory was equipped with the most modern devices and also received orders from foreign railroads.

It also manufactured shunting devices (spills).

The company had an extensive domestic and foreign organization, and had its own branches in Berlin, Leipzig, Görlitz, Gdansk, Bromberg, Katowice, Prague and Bucharest. The main manufacturing plant was located in the Wroclaw suburb of Schmiedefeld, where there was a large locomotive factory and a special light-railway factory for small railroad cars, switches, etc. There were also larger workshops in Bromberg, Berlin, and Leipzig. A total of about 800 workers were employed.

== Nazi era persecution ==
After Adolf Hitler came to power in Germany in 1933, Leo Smoscewer and his family were persecuted by the Nazis because of their Jewish heritage. His company Smoschewer & Co was Aryanized, that is, transferred to non-Jewish owners, in 1938. In the course of the Aryanization, the Feldbahnfabrik F. W. Budich emerged from his company in 1938.

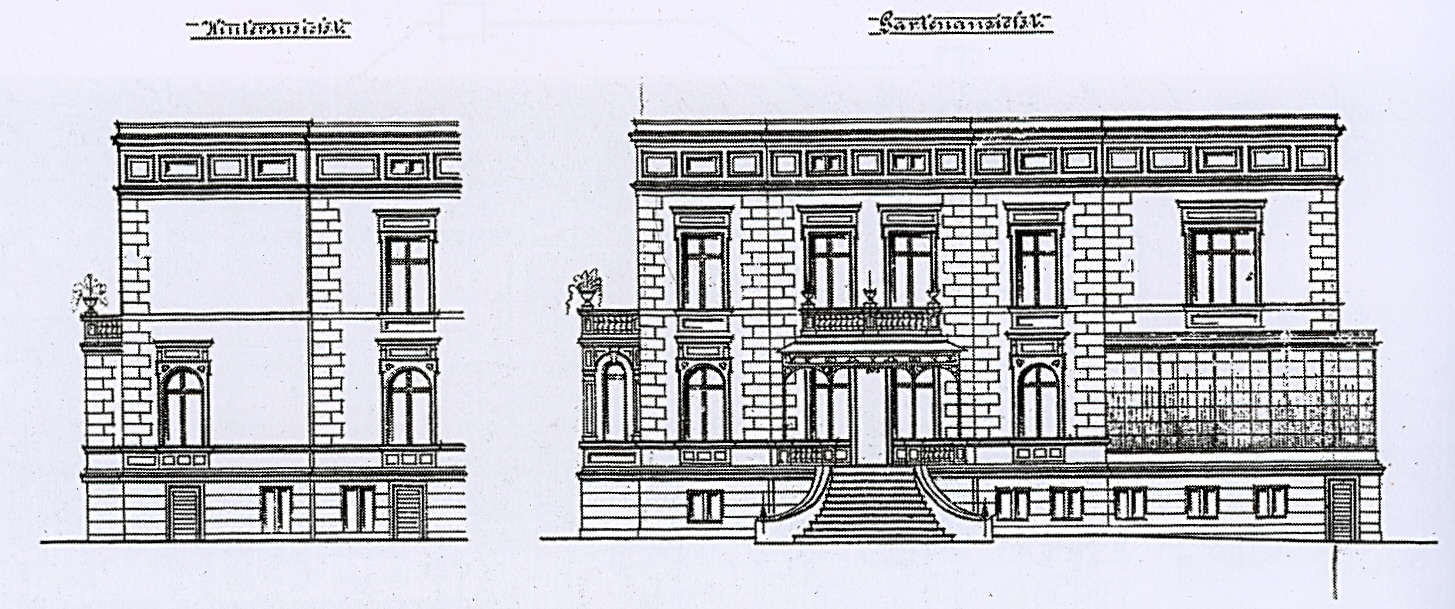
Villa Smoschewer, Lindenallee 12 in Breslau (Ansichten)

Smoschewer died on July 15, 1938. His widow Elise committed suicide in May 1939.

== Art collection Smoschewer ==
The Smoschewer art collection included numerous paintings, watercolors and graphics. Represented were mainly German contemporary painters such as Lovis Corinth, Wilhelm Leibl, Max Liebermann, Max Slevogt, Hans Thoma and Wilhelm Trübner, as well as works by teachers from the Wroclaw Academy of Fine Arts, including Alexander Kanoldt, Konrad von Kardorff, Carlo Mense, Oskar Moll, Hans Purrmann and Max Wislicenus. The art collection also included sculptures by August Gaul, Theodor von Gosen and Georg Kolbe. Elise Smoschewer was portrayed by Lovis Corinth in 1906.

Some artworks have been restituted. In 2003, the Städtische Kunstsammlungen, Görlitz returned Gartenweg zum Sommerhaus (Godramstein) by Max Slevogt to the heirs. In 2004 Conrad Ansorge am Klavier by Max Slevogt was restituted by the Belvedere Museum in Vienna to the Smoschewer heirs. It has been seized by Nazis in 1939. Sinnendes Mädchen / Frau mit Schimmel (‘Pensive Girl/Women with White Horse’) (Lost Art-ID 302432) was restituted in 2022.

The German Lost Art Foundation lists several painting that were seized from the Smoschewers by the Nazis that have not yet been located.

=== Selected artworks from the collection ===
- Lovis Corinth
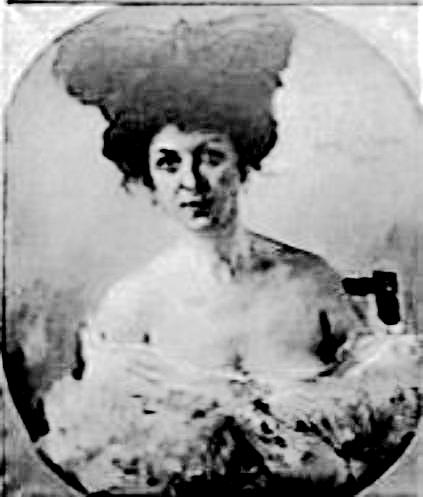
Porträt Elise Smoschewer, 1906 (Lovis Corinth)

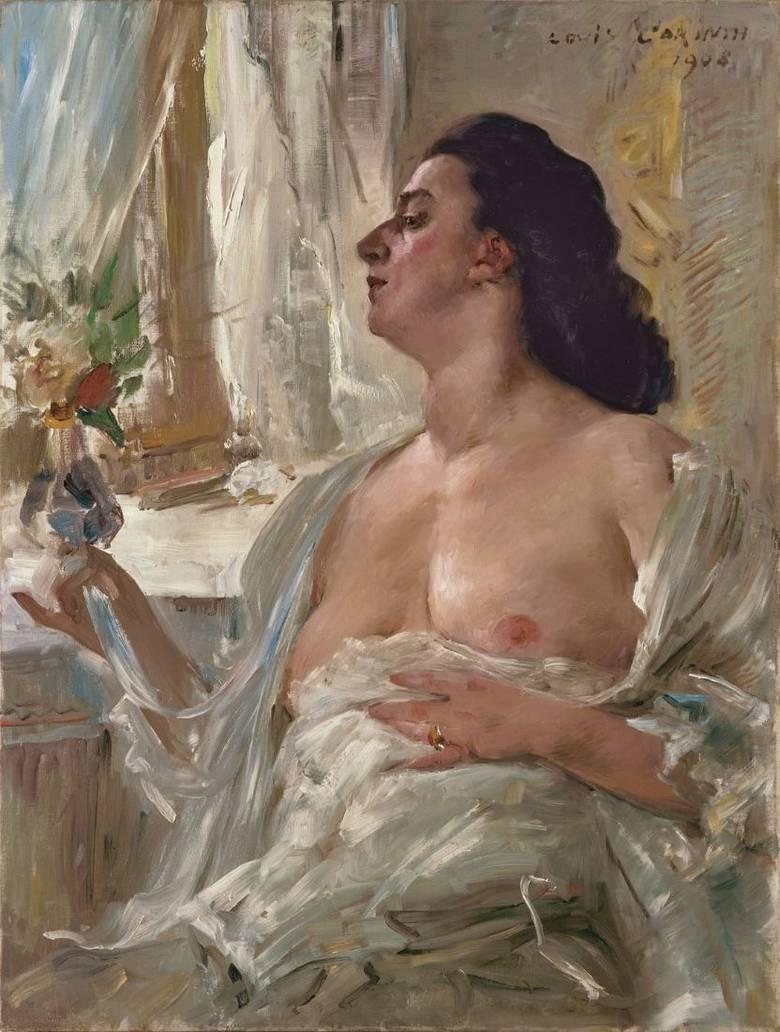
Porträt Elise Smoschewer, 1908 (Lovis Corinth)
- Alexander Kanoldt
  - Olevano / Italienische Landschaft
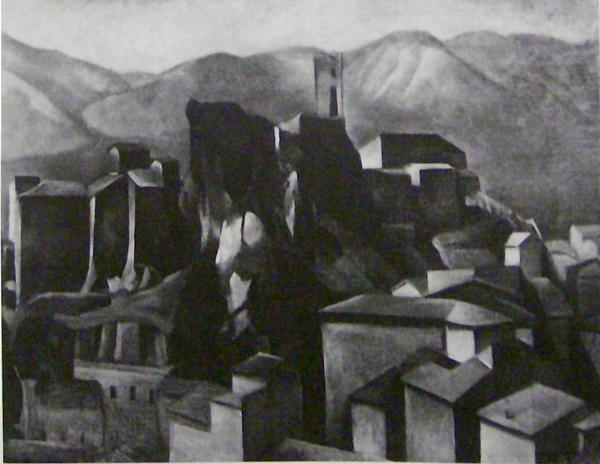
Olevano / Italienische Landschaft (Alexander Kanoldt)
- Max Klinger
  - Weg mit Pappeln /Landstraße
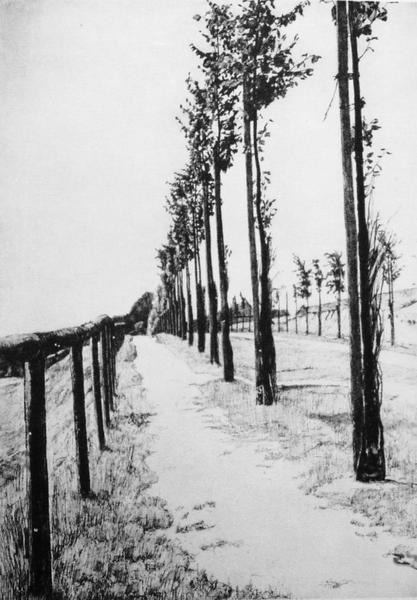
Zeichnung Weg mit Pappeln / Landstraße (Max Klinger)
- Max Slevogt
  - Gartenallee
  - Conrad Ansorge am Klavier
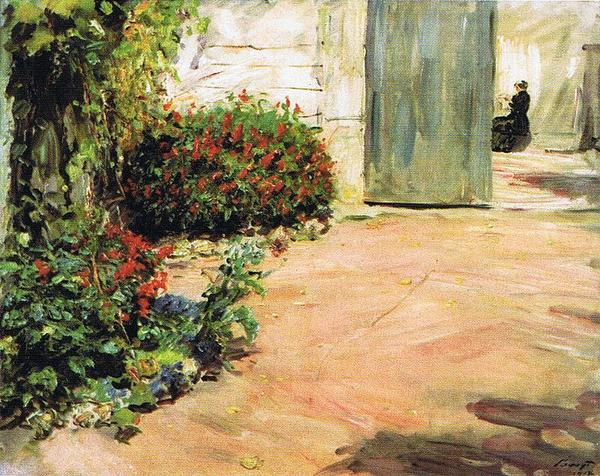
Gartenallee (Max Slevogt)

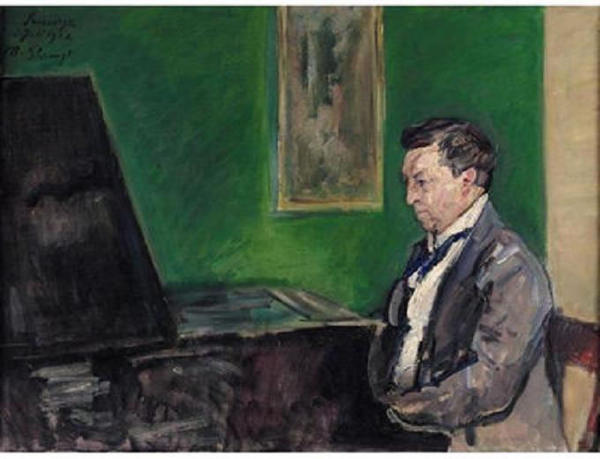
Conrad Ansorge am Klavier (Max Slevogt)
- Hans Thoma
  - Sinnendes Mädchen / Frau mit Schimmel
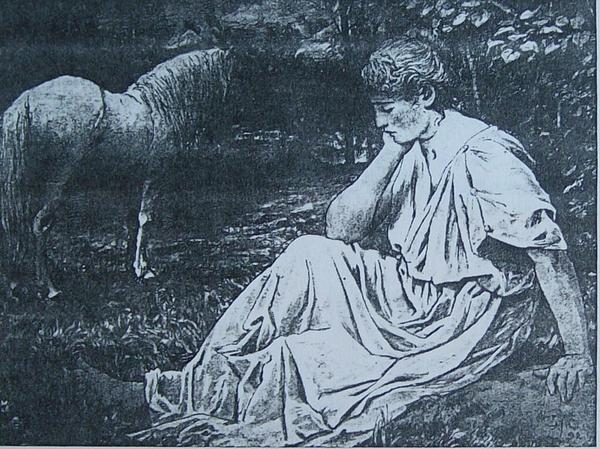
Zeichnung Sinnendes Mädchen / Frau mit Schimmel

== Literature ==
- Ramona Bräu: „Arisierung“ in Breslau. Die „Entjudung“ einer deutschen Großstadt und deren Entdeckung im polnischen Erinnerungsdiskurs. VDM Verlag Dr. Müller, Saarbrücken 2008, ISBN 978-3-8364-5958-7, S. 77 ff. (Kapitel 3.4.2 Die großen jüdischen Kunstsammlungen in Schlesien - Kunstraub.)
- Annerose Klammt, Marius Winzeler: „Die Moderne deutsche Kunst musste zur Geltung gebracht werden“. Zur Erwerbung von Kunstwerken aus jüdischem Eigentum für die Kunstsammlungen in Görlitz. In: Ulf Häder (Hrsg.): Beiträge öffentlicher Einrichtungen der Bundesrepublik Deutschland zum Umgang mit Kulturgütern aus ehemaligen jüdischen Besitz. Magdeburg 2001, S. 119–141.
- Marius Winzeler: Jüdische Sammler und Mäzene in Breslau. Von der Donation zur „Verwertung“ ihres Kunstbesitzes. In: Andrea Baresel-Brand, Peter Müller (Red.): Sammeln. Stiften. Fördern. Jüdische Mäzene in der deutschen Gesellschaft. Magdeburg 2006, S. 131–150.
- Małgorzata Stolarska-Fronia: Udział środowisk Żydów wrocławskich w artystycznym i kulturalnym życiu miasta od emancypacji do 1933 roku. Wydawnictwo Neriton, Warszawa 2008.
- Małgorzata Stolarska-Fronia: Jewish art collectors from Breslau and their impact on the city's cultural life at the end of the 19th and the beginning of the 20th century. In: Annette Weber (Hrsg.): Jüdische Sammler und ihr Beitrag zur Kultur der Moderne. (Internationales Symposium, 2007, Hochschule für Jüdische Studien / Zentrum für Europäische Kunstgeschichte der Ruprecht-Karls-Universität Heidelberg, Raphael Rosenberg) Winter, Heidelberg 2011, ISBN 978-3-8253-5907-2.

== See also ==
History of Wrocław

List of claims for restitution for Nazi-looted art

Jewish art collectors in Breslau
