= Leo Lewin =

German merchant and art collector

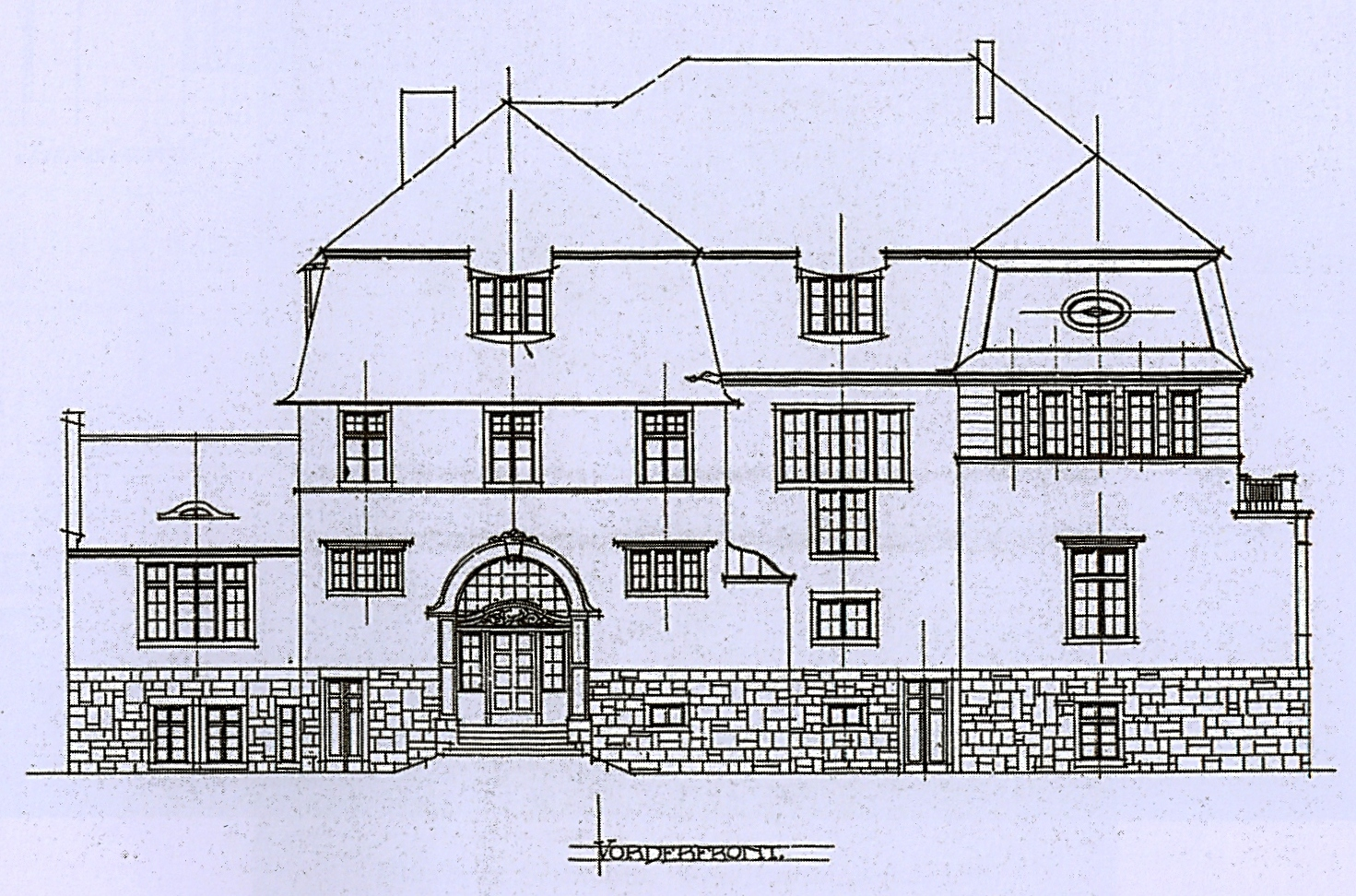
Villa Leo Lewin

Leo Lewin (born 1881 in Breslau; died 1965) was a German merchant, art collector and horse breeder who was persecuted by the Nazis due to being Jewish.

== Family ==
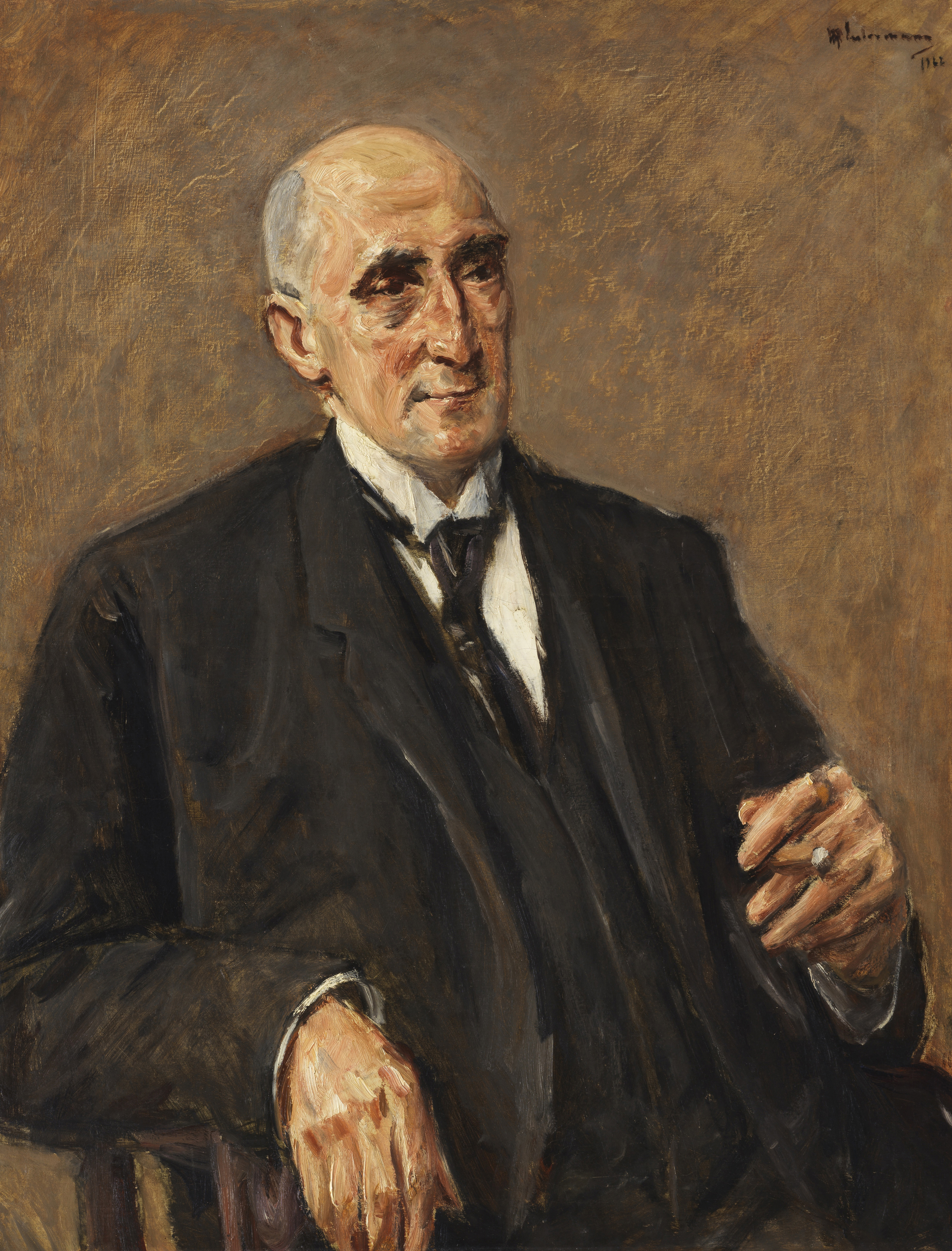
Portrait of Carl Lewin (by Max Liebermann)

Lewin was the eldest of six children of the Breslau textile manufacturer Carl Lewin (1855-1926). His older brother, Salo Lewin (1880–1975) was a lawyer and an art collector. The business C. Lewin was located at 7 Gartenstrasse (today's Piłsudskiego Street). During the First World War, the company delivered to the German army and equipped soldiers and horses, making the company prosperous.

Lewin married Helene Kosewski in 1917. The couple moved into a villa at Akazienallee 12 in Breslau; this was extensively rebuilt by Oskar Kaufmann with the help of numerous artists such as César Klein.

Helen Lewin

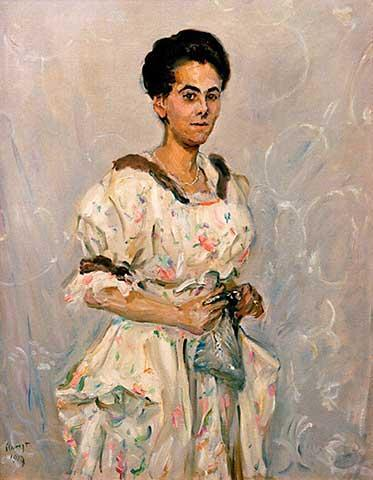
Porträt Helen Lewin (Max Slevogt)

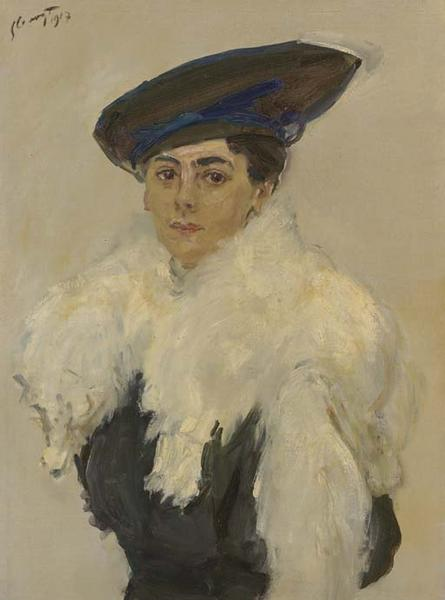
Porträt Helen Lewin (Max Slevogt)

== Horse breeding ==
After the First World War, Leo Lewin leased the Römerhof stud established by Georg von Bleichröder in Erftstadt and had the war damage repaired. Under Lewin, the mare population comprised up to 80 animals, at that time the largest population in Germany. From 1925 Lewin successfully organized yearling auctions. After the National Socialists came to power in Germany, the estate was leased to Rudolf von Skrbensky.

In 1921 Lewin also leased Otto von Goßler's run-down stud in the old fishing village of Bindow near Königs Wusterhausen. Here he planned to set up a stud specializing in trotters. Success soon set in, Homer, Zora and Lebenskünstler won the Blue Ribbon from 1924 to 1926. In 1927 Lewin relocated breeding to the Stauffenburg domain. Lewin also produced some of the winning horses that racing stable owner Emil Perk from Berlin started on all German racetracks.

== Art collection ==
Leo Lewin had an important art collection.

He was a member of the Künstlerbund, which promoted Silesian artists.

The collection consisted of many paintings and drawings by Max Slevogt and Max Liebermann (Bügelnde Dame), who was a friend and created portraits of the Lewin family. The sculptor August Gaul created the Kleiner Tierpark for Lewin, consisting of fifteen tiny bronze and silver figures, and also a fountain with goose statues, which stood in the villa garden on Akazienallee. In the villa there were paintings by Hans von Marées, Wilhelm Trübner, Lovis Corinth (Walchensee im Herbst), Hans Thoma and Carl Spitzweg, as well as sculptures by Georg Kolbe and Ernst Barlach. Lewin also owned some drawings by the painter Adolph von Menzel, such as the procession in Hofgastein, which is now in the Neue Pinakothek in Munich.

In 1921 he acquired two landscape paintings at Edvard Munch's exhibition in the Cassirer gallery in Berlin. He also acquired still lifes by Pablo Picasso, which are now in the Tate Gallery in London, as well as works by French realists such as Camille Corot (for example poetry, now in the Wallraf-Richartz Museum in Cologne), Honoré Daumier. He owned a work by Édouard Manet, which shows a young bull in a meadow and was created in Versailles in 1881, as well as portraits by Renoir, a landscape painting by Camille Pissarro, a painting by Paul Cézanne and a painting by Claude Monet, the snow-covered vineyards at Moulin d'Orgemont shows. Before Max Silberberg purchased it, Lewin was the owner of the Courbet now at Yale University Art Gallery entitled, "Le Grand Pont".

In April 1927, Lewin auctioned some of his collection at Paul Cassirer.

== Nazi persecution and emigration ==
When Hitler came to power, the Lewins were persecuted because of their Jewish heritage. Forced pay the special taxes that Nazis imposed on Jews, he had to auction his print collection at Max Perls. Lewin was able to take the remaining works of art, especially the holdings of the extensive library, with him when he emigrated to the north of England, where they appeared in second-hand bookshops in the following years, recognizable by a conspicuous bookplate by Max Slevogt. Lewin's horse breeding estate was leased to Rudolf von Skrbensky.

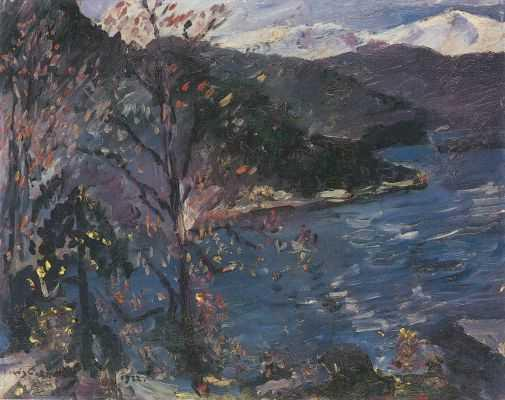
Lovis Corinth, Walchensee im Herbst (Sammlung Leo Lewin und Ismar Littmann).

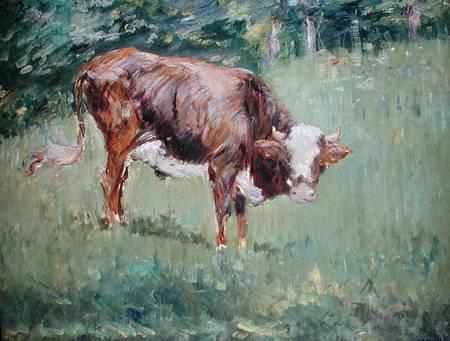
Edouard Manet, Junger Stier auf der Wiese.

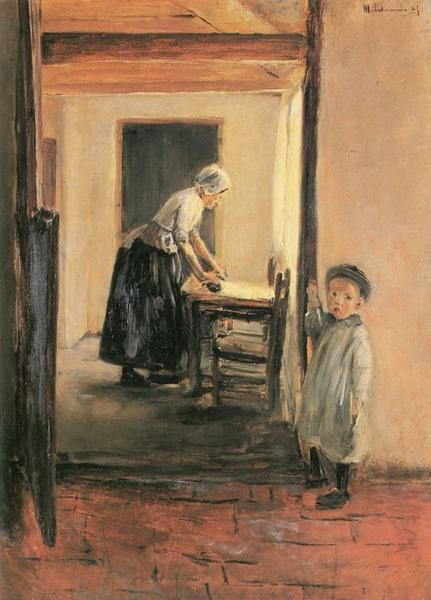
Max Liebermann, Bügelnde Dame (Sammlung Leo Lewin).

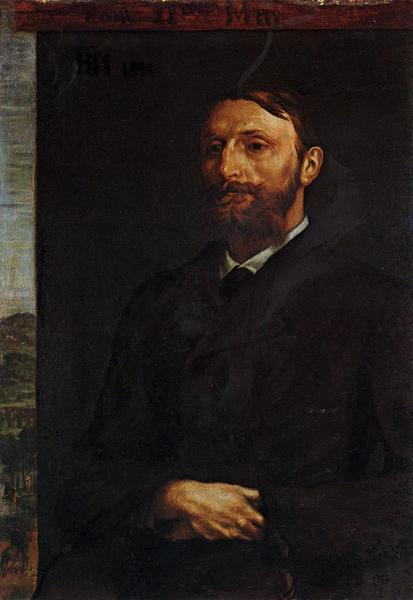
Hans von Marees, Porträt Konrad Fiedlers (Sammlung Leo Lewin).

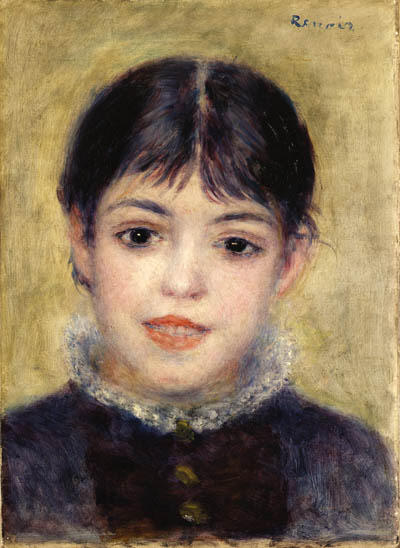
Auguste Renoir, Lachendes kleines Mädchen, Porträt der Schauspielerin Jeanne Samary (Sammlung Leo Lewin u. Max Silberberg).

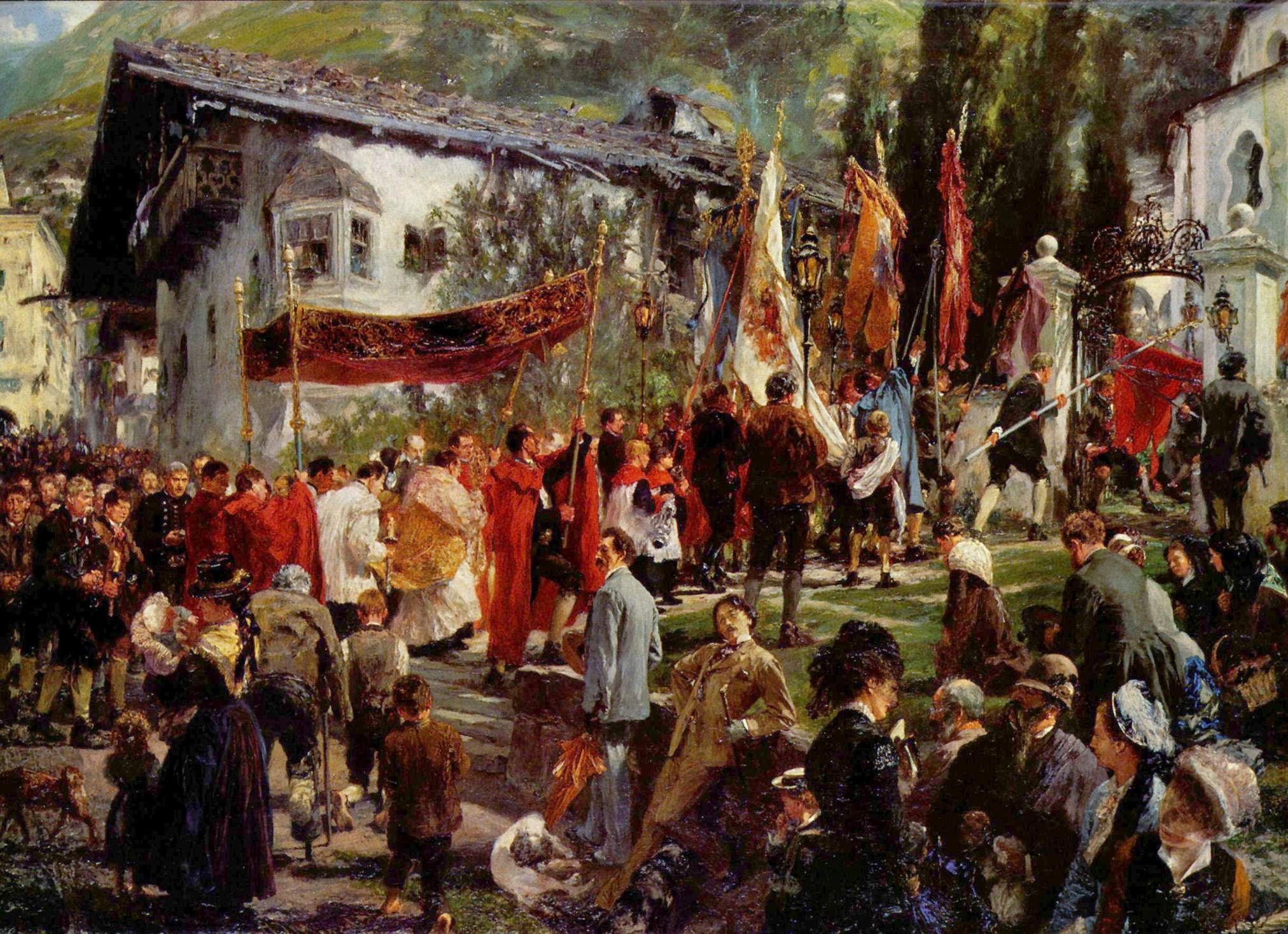
Adolph von Menzel, Prozession in Hofgastein.

== Soccer ==
In 1910 Lewin took over the leadership of the football club SC 1904 Breslau, later renamed United Breslauer Sportfreunde, which he also supported financially.

== Legacy and restitution ==
Lewin's name appears in lists of Jewish art collectors targeted by Nazi persecution. However, it is not known what became of many of the paintings in his collection or his activities after the war.

In October 2025 the Staatliche Graphische Sammlung München announced that it would restitute "a series of watercolor drawings, the so-called “Prince Regent Series” (Prinzregentenzyklus), as well as a watercolor titled “Landscape near Oberbozen” by Max Slevogt" to the heirs of Leo Lewin and his brother Salo Lewin.

Salo Lewin put the artworks for sale when he was imprisoned in the Nazi Sachsenhausen concentration camp

== Literature ==
- Paul Cassirer, Hugo Helbing: Sammlung Leo Lewin Breslau. Deutsche und Französische Meister des XIX. Jahrhunderts. Gemälde, Plastik, Zeichnungen. Berlin 1927 (Versteigerungskatalog).
- Marius Winzeler: Jüdische Sammler und Mäzene in Breslau – von der Donation zur „Verwertung“ ihres Kunstbesitzes. In: Andrea Baresel-Brand, Peter Müller (Hrsg.): Sammeln. Stiften. Fördern. Jüdische Mäzene in der deutschen Gesellschaft. Magdeburg 2006, S. 131–150.
- Ramona Bräu: „Arisierung“ in Breslau – Die „Entjudung“ einer deutschen Großstadt und deren Entdeckung im polnischen Erinnerungsdiskurs. VDM Verlag Dr. Müller, Saarbrücken 2008, ISBN 978-3-8364-5958-7, S. 81 (3.4.2 Die großen jüdischen Kunstsammlungen in Schlesien – Kunstraub.)

== Links ==
- Sammlung: Leo Lewin (1881-1965)
- Biography of Leo Lewin in Sammlung Leo Lewin Veröffentlichungsdatum: 13 / 12 / 2009 by Magdalena Palica
- Hampel Auction catalog with biographical information about Leo Lewin and his father Carl
- Beschreibung des Gestüts Römerhof in Erftstadt
- Artikel aus der Traber-Welt
- Webseite des Gestüts Römerhof
- Leo Lewin bei Galopp-Sieger
