= The Music Lovers =

1971 film by Ken Russell

- Film Poster
- Directed by: Ken Russell
- Screenplay by: Melvyn Bragg
- Based on: Beloved Friend, a collection of letters edited by Catherine Drinker Bowen and Barbara von Meck
- Produced by: Ken Russell
- Starring: Richard Chamberlain; Glenda Jackson
- Cinematography: Douglas Slocombe
- Edited by: Michael Bradsell
- Music by: André Previn
- Production companies: Russ-Arts; Russ Films
- Distributed by: United Artists
- Release dates: 6 July 1971 (London); 24 July 1971 (New York City); 25 July 1971 (United States)
- Running time: 124 minutes
- Country: United Kingdom
- Language: English
- Budget: $2 million

The Music Lovers is a 1971 British drama biographical film directed by Ken Russell and starring Richard Chamberlain and Glenda Jackson. The screenplay by Melvyn Bragg, based on Beloved Friend, a collection of personal correspondence edited by Catherine Drinker Bowen and Barbara von Meck, focuses on the life and career of 19th-century Russian composer Pyotr Ilyich Tchaikovsky. It was one of the director's biographical films about classical composers, which include Elgar (1962), Delius: Song of Summer (1968), Mahler (1974) and Lisztomania (1975), all made from an often idiosyncratic standpoint.

== Plot summary ==
Much of the film is without dialogue and the story is presented in flashbacks, nightmares, and fantasy sequences set to Tchaikovsky's music. As a child, the composer sees his mother die horribly, forcibly immersed in scalding water as a supposed cure for cholera, and is haunted by the scene throughout his musical career. Despite his difficulty in establishing his reputation, he attracts Madame Nadezhda von Meck as his patron.

Over time, Tchaikovsky's marriage to the allegedly nymphomaniacal Antonina Miliukova is plagued by his homosexual urges and lustful desire for Count Anton Chiluvsky. The dynamics of Tchaikovsky's life lead to his deteriorating mental health and the loss of von Meck's patronage, and he dies of cholera after deliberately drinking contaminated water, while his wife ends up in an insane asylum.

== Cast ==
- Richard Chamberlain as Pyotr Ilyich Tchaikovsky
  - Alex Brewer as young Pyotr
- Glenda Jackson as Nina (Antonina Milyukova)
- Max Adrian as Nikolai Rubinstein
- Christopher Gable as Count Anton Chiluvsky
- Kenneth Colley as Modest Tchaikovsky
- Izabella Telezynska as Madame Nadezhda von Meck
- Maureen Pryor as Nina's mother
- Sabina Maydelle as Sasha Tchaikovsky
- Andrew Faulds as Davidov
- Bruce Robinson as Alexei Sofronov
- Ben Aris as Young Lieutenant
- Xavier Russell as Koyola
- Dennis and John Myers as Von Meck twins
- Joanne Brown as Olga Bredska
- Alexei Jawdokimov as Dmitri Shubelov
- Alexander Russell as Von Meck child
- Clive Cazes as Doctor
- Georgina Parkinson as Odile in Swan Lake
- Alan Dubreuil as Prince in Swan Lake
- Graham Armitage as Prince Balukin
- Ernest Bale as Headwaiter
- Consuela Chapman as Tchaikovsky's mother (Alexandra Andreyevna)
- James Russell as Bobyek
- Victoria Russell as Tatiana

== Production ==
=== Development ===
Producer Harry Saltzman had seen some of Russell's television work and wanted to collaborate with him. Russell had made many films for television about composers and artists, including Debussy (The Debussy Film) and Strauss (Dance of the Seven Veils), and suggested a biopic of Pyotr Ilyich Tchaikovsky, whom he had long admired. Saltzman wanted to do something more commercial, leading to Billion Dollar Brain (1967). Following that film, Russell tried to get Saltzman to finance the Tchaikovsky film again but the producer declined as Dimitri Tiomkin was making his own Tchaikovsky film.

Eventually, United Artists agreed to finance following the success of Women in Love. Russell later claimed: "if I hadn't told United Artists that it was a story about a homosexual who fell in love with a nymphomaniac it might have never been financed."

The script was based on a collection of letters from Tchaikovsky, Beloved Friend, published in 1937.

Originally titled Tchaikovsky, Russell's film focused on the years 1874–76, which Russell felt were the most crucial in the composer's life. The title was changed to The Lonely Heart to differentiate from the Russian film released the previous year. The title card ultimately reads Ken Russell's Film on Tchaikovsky and The Music Lovers .

Russell said: "The film is about the fact that Tchaikovsky couldn't love anyone even though he wrote some of the world's most beautiful music. He loved himself really and his sister. The film is about how artists transcend personal problems, how he used these problems and their results to create this particular kind of music." The director later added "there's as much tranquillity in my film on Tchaikovsky as there is in his music."

"Great heroes are the stuff of myth and legend, not facts," he added. "Music and facts don't mix. Tchaikovsky said: 'My life is in my music.' And who can deny that the man's music is not utterly fantastic? So likewise the movie! I sought to honour his genius by offering up my own small portion of his courage to create."

=== Casting ===
Russell offered the two lead roles to actors he worked with on Women in Love, Glenda Jackson and Alan Bates. Both accepted, but Bates then changed his mind. Russell felt this was because Bates "thought it might not be good for his image to play two sexually deviant parts in rapid succession."

UA wanted a star to play Tchaikovsky but Russell struggled to find someone willing. Richard Chamberlain was suggested, who had recently relocated to the UK. Russell said "When his name was originally put forward I nearly had a heart attack. I'd only seen him as a bland TV doctor." However, the director changed his mind after he saw the actor in a TV version of The Portrait of a Lady ("I knew we had a contender"). When he learned that Chamberlain was a skilled piano player, the actor was cast.

Chamberlain called the role "easily the biggest challenge of my career." Russell said Chamberlain "had a certain quiet dignity... which I felt the character needed. He was good to work with, very gentle and sweet; he did everything we asked him."

=== Production notes ===
- Jackson said the filmmakers tried to research insane asylums in Russia at the time by asking the Russian embassy "but they told us they were all wonderful so we ended up literally making the film out of the imagination of Ken Russell."
- Jackson said "I think people will love it or hate it but I doubt that anyone will go away feeling nothing. I think it's really quite extraordinary." She also said she preferred Women in Love to The Music Lovers "because it had the better script and that makes all the difference."
- Rafael Orozco recorded the piano pieces played by Tchaikovsky in the film.
- Russell brought on his wife Shirley as costume designer and cast four of their children – Alexander, Victoria, James, and Xavier – in small roles.
- In one sequence, Tchaikovsky and his patron glimpse each other from a distance as she passes through a wood in her carriage. In real life, their paths accidentally crossed in an Italian park. Later, his wife Nina loses her mind and is placed in an insane asylum; in reality, she was not institutionalised until after his death.
- Jackson and Andrew Faulds later served together as Labour Party MPs in the British House of Commons from 1992 to 1997, while screenwriter Melvyn Bragg has been a Labour member of the House of Lords since 1998.

== Soundtrack ==
The London Symphony Orchestra, conducted by André Previn, performs excerpts from the following pieces by Tchaikovsky:

- Piano Concerto in B-flat minor (soloist Rafael Orozco)
- Eugene Onegin (soprano April Cantelo)
- Symphony No. 6 in B minor, Pathétique
- Manfred Symphony
- Romeo and Juliet
- 1812 Overture
- Incidental music to Hamlet
- Symphony No. 5 in E minor
- Symphony No. 4 in F minor

== Release ==
=== Reception ===
Rotten Tomatoes gave the film a 59% approval rating on its Tomato meter, based on 17 reviews.

In his review for The New York Times, Vincent Canby stated:

Mr. Russell has told us a lot less about Tchaikovsky and his music than he has about himself as a filmmaker . . . [His] speculations are not as offensive as his frontal – and often absurd – attacks on the emotions. Richard Chamberlain . . . is fine as Tchaikovsky, looking a bit like a haunted faun, and Glenda Jackson is all sinewy nerves as Nina, but they are hard put to match the . . . nonstop hysteria of the production that surrounds them . . . I expect many people may look on The Music Lovers as an advance on the classical musical biographies turned out by Hollywood in the 1940s, but for all of its so-called frankness, there isn't much difference between this kind of sensational, souped-up popularization and the sort of pious, souped-down popularization that cast Cornel Wilde as Chopin and Robert Walker as Brahms.

Roger Ebert of the Chicago Sun-Times called it "an involved and garish private fantasy" and "totally irresponsible as a film about, or inspired by, or parallel to, or bearing a vague resemblance to, Tchaikovsky, his life and times."

Time commented: "Seventy-seven years have passed since Tchaikovsky's death. In this epoch of emancipated morality, it would be reasonable to expect that his life would be reviewed with fresh empathy. But no; the same malignant attitudinizing that might have been applied decades ago is still at work . . . [the film's] arch tableaux, its unstable amalgam of life and art, make it a director's picture . . . attempting to reveal psychology through music, Russell makes every character grotesque, every bar of music programmatic."

Variety opined, "By unduly emphasizing the mad and the perverse in their biopic . . . producer-director Ken Russell and scripter Melvyn Bragg lose their audience. The result is a motion picture that is frequently dramatically and visually stunning but more often tedious and grotesque . . . Instead of a Russian tragedy, Russell seems more concerned with haunting the viewers' memory with shocking scenes and images. The opportunity to create a memorable and fluid portrait of the composer has been sacrificed for a musical Grand Guignol."

In the Cleveland Press, Toni Mastroianni said, "The movies have treated composers notoriously badly but few films have been quite so awful as this pseudo-biography of Tchaikovsky."

Dave Kehr of the Chicago Reader described the film as a "Ken Russell fantasia – musical biography as wet dream" and added, "[it] hangs together more successfully than his other similar efforts, thanks largely to a powerhouse performance by Glenda Jackson, one actress who can hold her own against Russell's excess."

TV Guide calls it "a spurious biography of a great composer that is so filled with wretched excesses that one hardly knows where to begin . . . all the attendant surrealistic touches director Ken Russell has added take this out of the realm of plausibility and into the depths of cheap gossip."

Time Out New York calls it "vulgar, excessive, melodramatic and self-indulgent . . . the drama is at fever pitch throughout . . . Chamberlain doesn't quite have the range required in the central role, though his keyboard skills are impressive."

In the London Times, John Russell Taylor wrote of Russell when reviewing this film: "His talent, his sheer zest for film-making are not in doubt. But there is no doubt that his unique gifts are matched at times by a unique talent for misapplying them."

Pauline Kael would later say in an interview: "You really feel you should drive a stake through the heart of the man who made it. I mean it is so vile. It is so horrible."

=== Home media ===
The Music Lovers was released to DVD by MGM Home Entertainment on 12 October 2011 via its DVD-on-demand service available through Amazon.

== See also ==
- List of British films of 1971

== Bibliography ==
- Siegel, Barbara (1989). Richard Chamberlain. Martin's Press. ISBN 9780312026356.
- Russell, Ken (1991). Altered states. Bantam Books. ISBN 9780553078312.
