= Elgar: Fantasy on a Composer on a Bicycle =

2002 film

- Title card
- Genre: Drama documentary
- Written by: Ken Russell
- Directed by: Ken Russell
- Starring: James Johnston
- Country of origin: United Kingdom
- Original language: English

Production
- Producer: Ken Russell
- Cinematography: Mike Lane
- Camera setup: Trevor Adamson
- Running time: 50 minutes
- Production company: London Weekend Television

Original release
- Release: 22 September 2002

Elgar: Fantasy on a Composer on a Bicycle is a 2002 British documentary film by Ken Russell, who had directed the film Elgar about the composer for the television series Monitor 40 years earlier.

== Cast ==
- James Johnston as Elgar
- Tim Green as Young Elgar
- The Medina Marching Band as Giants
- The Gilliam Cartwright School of Dance as Fairies
- Elize Russell as Lady Alice
- Louisa Jane Nicholas as Carice
- Tilly Gaunt as Dorabella
- Mary Stockley as Helen Weaver
- Sara Neighbour as Rosa Burley
- Richrard Swerrun as Jaegar
- Chloe Treend as Windflower

== Production ==
The film was filmed on the Malvern Hills and featured local children in roles.
