= Shirley Ann Russell =

British film costume designer (1935–2002)

Shirley Russell
- Born: Shirley Ann Kingdon; 11 March 1935; London, England
- Died: 4 March 2002 (aged 66); London, England
- Occupation: Costume designer
- Years active: 1956–2002
- Spouse: Ken Russell (m. 1956; div. 1978)
- Children: 5

Shirley Ann Russell (née Kingdon; 11 March 1935 – 4 March 2002) was a British costume designer. She has received various accolades, including a BAFTA Film Award and two BAFTA Television Awards, in addition to nominations for two Academy Awards and an Emmy Award.

== Career ==
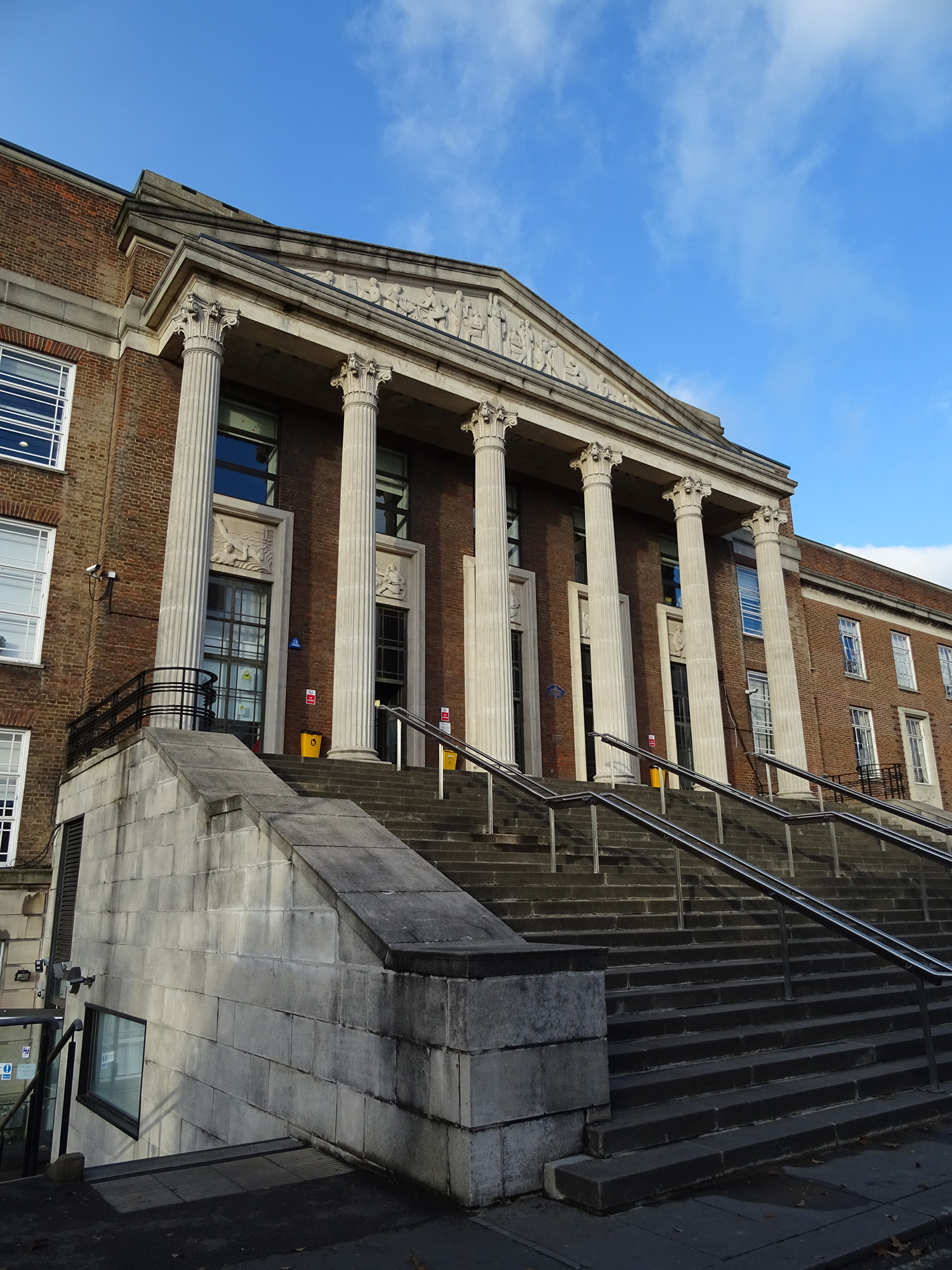
Walthamstow College where both Russells studied

Russell studied Fashion at Walthamstow College of Art, and she later attended the Royal College of Art. She ran her own firm of film costumiers, called The Last Picture Frock, particularly specialising in 1930s and 1940s clothing. The firm was sold to the costumier Angels in the 1970s. Her interest in historic costume began when she assisted Doris Langley Moore, the founder of the Fashion Museum, Bath. She was a widely-acknowledged expert on period costuming and was often called upon by art dealers to help them date paintings.

Russell's costume designs were detailed and nuanced, using costume to show subtle distinctions in class. She was known for the weight and authenticity her design lent to characters. In 1969's film Women in Love her designs signalled the social and cultural differences between the two Brangwen sisters and the Crich family, and were nominated for a Best Costume Design BAFTA. She designed for stars such as Vanessa Redgrave in A Song at Twilight, Rudolf Nureyev in Valentino and Roger Daltrey in Lisztomania. Her design for Daltrey was described by Russell as "fantasticated gear" - the jacket had huge labels featuring keyboard motifs. Another "fantasticated design" is 'The Acid Queen' from Tommy.

Collaborations with her husband Ken Russell included: Women in Love, Amelia and the Angel, The Music Lovers, The Devils, The Boy Friend, Savage Messiah, Mahler, Tommy, Lisztomania, and Valentino. Russell's other credits include The Little Prince, Lady Chatterley's Lover, The Return of the Soldier, The Razor's Edge, Hope and Glory, The Bride, Yanks, Gulliver's Travels, I Dreamed of Africa, and Shackleton.

== Selected filmography ==
=== Film ===
| Year | Title | Director | Notes |
|---|---|---|---|
| 1958 | Amelia and the Angel | Ken Russell | Short film |
| 1964 | French Dressing | Ken Russell | |
| 1967 | Billion Dollar Brain | Ken Russell | Credited as Shirley Kingdon; Kingdon only designed costumes for Françoise Dorléac |
| 1969 | Women in Love | Ken Russell | |
| 1971 | The Music Lovers | Ken Russell | |
| 1971 | The Devils | Ken Russell | |
| 1971 | The Boy Friend | Ken Russell | |
| 1972 | Savage Messiah | Ken Russell | |
| 1974 | Mahler | Ken Russell | |
| 1974 | The Little Prince | Stanley Donen | |
| 1975 | Inserts | John Byrum | |
| 1975 | Tommy | Ken Russell | |
| 1975 | Lisztomania | Ken Russell | |
| 1977 | Valentino | Ken Russell | |
| 1979 | Agatha | Michael Apted | Also production designer |
| 1979 | Yanks | John Schlesinger | |
| 1979 | Cuba | Richard Lester | |
| 1981 | Lady Chatterley's Lover | Just Jaeckin | |
| 1981 | Reds | Warren Beatty | |
| 1982 | The Return of the Soldier | Alan Bridges | |
| 1984 | The Razor's Edge | John Byrum | |
| 1985 | The Bride | Franc Roddam | |
| 1987 | Hope and Glory | John Boorman | |
| 1997 | FairyTale: A True Story | Charles Sturridge | |
| 2000 | I Dreamed of Africa | Hugh Hudson | |
| 2001 | Enigma | Michael Apted | |

=== Television ===
| Year | Title | Notes |
|---|---|---|
| 1966 | Isadora Duncan, the Biggest Dancer in the World | Television film |
| 1967–1970 | Omnibus | 3 episodes |
| 1983 | Wagner | 10 episodes |
| 1996 | Gulliver's Travels | 2 episodes |
| 2000 | Longitude | 2 episodes |
| 2002 | Shackleton | 2 episodes |

== Awards and nominations ==
| Award | Year (Note: Indicates the year of ceremony. Each year is linked to the article about the awards held that year, wherever possible.) | Category | Work | Result | Ref. |
|---|---|---|---|---|---|
| Academy Awards | 1980 | Best Costume Design | Agatha | Nominated | |
| Academy Awards | 1982 | Best Costume Design | Reds | Nominated | |
| British Academy Film Awards | 1970 | Best Costume Design | Women in Love | Nominated | |
| British Academy Film Awards | 1978 | Best Costume Design | Valentino | Nominated | |
| British Academy Film Awards | 1980 | Best Costume Design | Yanks | Won | |
| British Academy Film Awards | 1980 | Best Costume Design | Agatha | Nominated | |
| British Academy Film Awards | 1983 | Best Costume Design | Reds | Nominated | |
| British Academy Film Awards | 1988 | Best Costume Design | Hope and Glory | Nominated | |
| British Academy Television Craft Awards | 1997 | Best Costume Design | Gulliver's Travels | Won | |
| British Academy Television Craft Awards | 2001 | Best Costume Design | Longitude | Nominated | |
| British Academy Television Craft Awards | 2003 | Best Costume Design | Shackleton | Won | |
| Primetime Emmy Awards | 1996 | Outstanding Costume Design for a Miniseries or a Special | Gulliver's Travels | Nominated | |
| Saturn Awards | 1986 | Best Costume Design | The Bride | Nominated | |

== Personal life ==
Russell was born as Shirley Ann Kingdon in London, England. Whilst studying at Walthamstow College of Art, she met her husband the film director Ken Russell, to whom she was married from 1956 to 1978. They both converted to Roman Catholicism prior to their marriage. They had five children: Xavier, James, Alexander, Victoria and Toby. Following her divorce from Ken Russell, she lived for many years with director Jonathan Benson in Chiswick.

=== Death ===
She died from cancer in March 2002, one week before her 67th birthday.
