= Don't Shoot the Composer =

1966 British film on Georges Delerue

- Directed by: Ken Russell
- Produced by: Ken Russell
- Release date: 1966
- Country: United Kingdom
- Language: English

Don't Shoot the Composer is a 1966 British documentary on the French cinema composer Georges Delerue. It was made by Ken Russell, who had used Delerue's music in French Dressing (1964) and would use it in Women in Love (1969).
