= Kenneth Harper =

English film producer

- Born: 1913; Kinver, South Staffordshire, England
- Died: 1998 (aged 84–85); Banbury, Oxfordshire, England
- Occupation: Film producer
- Years active: 1954–1973

Kenneth Harper (1913–1998) was an English film producer. He produced 13 films between 1954 and 1973. He was a member of the jury at the 21st Berlin International Film Festival.

He produced the first films of Peter Yates and Ken Russell and four films starring Cliff Richard. In a 1964 interview he said he found producing "fascinating - finding the story, the director and the cast: mixing people, you know? It's like being a chef in the kitchen."

== Biography ==
Harper's first credit as producer was a Dirk Bogarde comedy, For Better, for Worse (1954) directed by J. Lee Thompson for Associated British. Harper and Thompson reunited on Yield to the Night (1956) a drama with Diana Dors.

Harper teamed up with George Willoughby and made Action of the Tiger (1957) at MGM, directed by Terence Young, and Passionate Summer (1958) for Rank.

Harper had a big hit with The Young Ones (1961) starring Cliff Richard and directed by Sidney J. Furie. It was the second most popular film of the year at the British box-office. After doing the comedy Go to Blazes (1962) he did a second film with Richard, Summer Holiday (1963), the first feature directed by Peter Yates and another hit.

Harper producer Ken Russell's first film as director, but French Dressing (1964) flopped. A third film with Richard, Wonderful Life (1964) was a disappointment. So too was Two Weeks in September (1967).

More popular was Prudence and the Pill (1968).

His last two credits were The Virgin and the Gypsy (1970) and Take Me High (1973), the latter another film with Richard.

== Filmography ==
- For Better, for Worse (1954)
- Yield to the Night (1956)
- Action of the Tiger (1957)
- Passionate Summer (1958)
- The Young Ones (1961)
- Go to Blazes (1962)
- Summer Holiday (1963)
- French Dressing (1964)
- Wonderful Life (US title: Swingers' Paradise 1964)
- Two Weeks in September (1967)
- Prudence and the Pill (1968)
- The Virgin and the Gypsy (1970)
- Take Me High (1973)
