= Pauline Boty =

British pop art painter (1938–1966)

- Boty in 1964 (portrait by David Bailey)
- Born: 6 March 1938; Carshalton, Surrey, England
- Died: 1 July 1966 (aged 28); London, England
- Known for: Painting
- Movement: Pop art
- Spouse: Clive Goodwin (m. 1963)
- Children: 1

Pauline Boty (6 March 1938 – 1 July 1966) was a British painter and co-founder of the 1960s' British Pop art movement of which she was the only acknowledged female member. Boty's paintings and collages often demonstrate a joy in self-assured femininity and female sexuality, as well as criticism (both overt and implicit) of the "man's world" in which she lived. Her rebellious art, combined with her free-spirited lifestyle, has made Boty a herald of 1970s' feminism.

== Life and works ==
=== Early life and education ===
Pauline Veronica Boty was born in Carshalton, Surrey, in 1938 into a middle-class Catholic family. The youngest of four children, she had three older brothers and a stern father who made her keenly aware of her position as a girl. In 1954 she won a scholarship to the Wimbledon School of Art, which she attended despite her father's disapproval. Boty's mother, on the other hand, was supportive, having herself been a frustrated artist who had been denied parental permission to attend the Slade School of Fine Art.

Boty earned an Intermediate diploma in lithography (1956) and a National Diploma in Design in stained glass (1958). Her schoolmates called her "The Wimbledon Bardot" on account of her resemblance to the French film star Brigitte Bardot. Encouraged by her tutor Charles Carey to explore collage techniques, Boty's painting became more experimental. Her work showed an interest in popular culture early on. In 1957 one of her pieces was shown at the Young Contemporaries exhibition alongside work by Robyn Denny, Richard Smith and Bridget Riley.

She studied at the School of Stained Glass at the Royal College of Art from 1958 to 1961. She had wanted to attend the School of Painting, but was dissuaded from applying as admission rates for women were much lower in that department. Despite the institutionalised sexism at her college, Boty was one of the stronger students in her class, and in 1960 one of her stained-glass works was included in the travelling exhibition Modern Stained Glass organised by the Arts Council. Boty continued to paint on her own in her student flat in west London and in 1959 she had three more works selected for the Young Contemporaries exhibition. During this time she also became friends with other emerging Pop artists, such as David Hockney, Derek Boshier, Peter Phillips and Peter Blake.

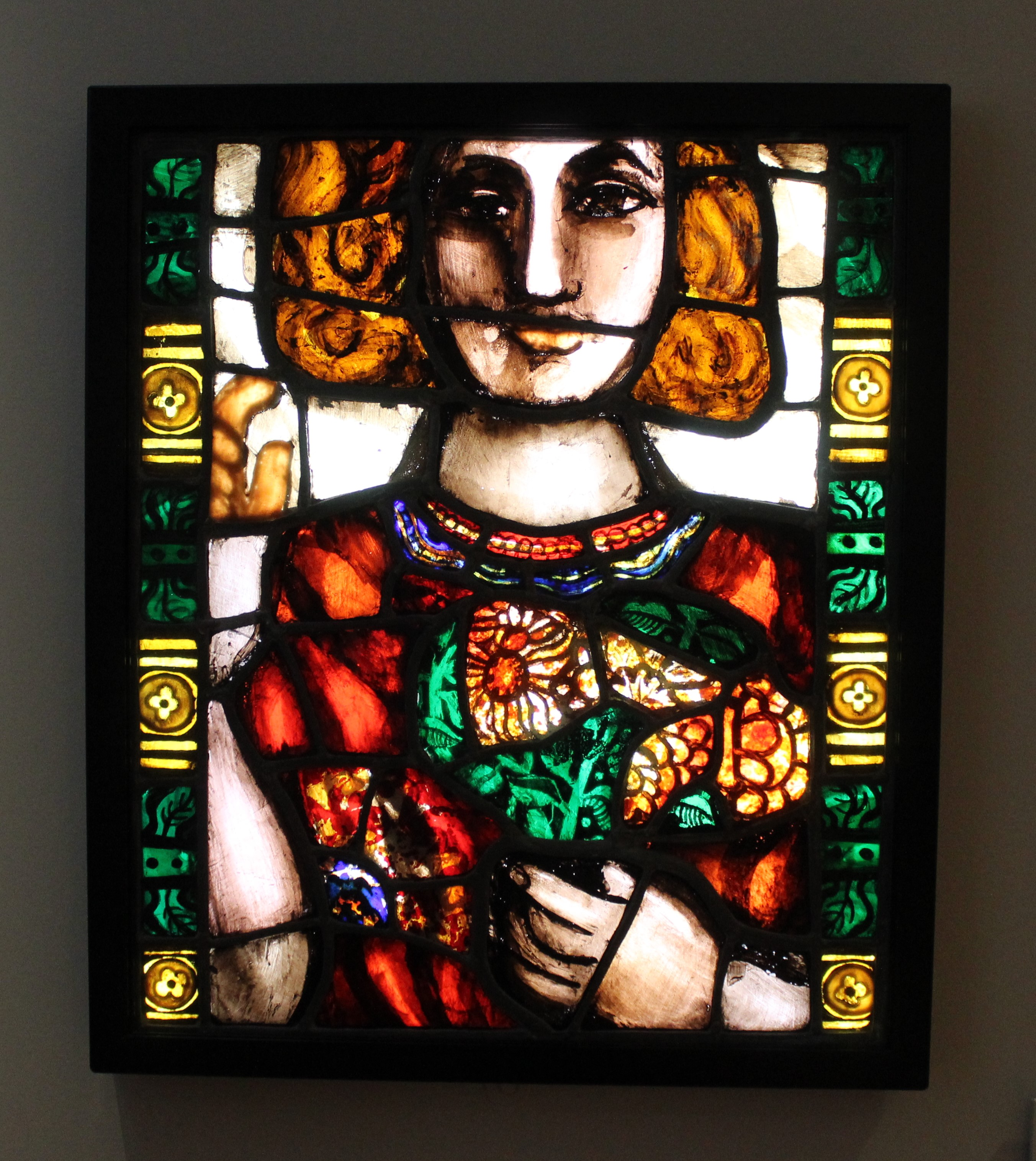
Self-portrait in stained glass, circa 1958

While at the Royal College of Art, Boty engaged in a number of extracurricular activities. She sang, danced, and acted in risqué college revues, published her poetry in an alternative student magazine, and was a knowledgeable presence in the college's film society, especially in regard to European new wave cinema. She was also an active participant in Anti-Ugly Action, a group of RCA students involved in the stained glass, and later architecture, courses who protested against new British architecture that they considered offensive and of poor quality.

=== Career ===
Boty was at her most productive two years after graduating from college. She developed a signature Pop style and iconography. Her first group show, "Blake, Boty, Porter, Reeve," which was held in November 1961 at A.I.A. Gallery in London, is recognised as one of the earliest British Pop art shows. She exhibited twenty collages, including Is it a bird, is it a plane? and a rose is a rose is a rose, which demonstrated her interest in drawing from both high and low popular culture sources in her art (the first title references the Superman comic, the second quotes the American expatriate poet Gertrude Stein).

The following spring Boty, Peter Blake, Derek Boshier and Peter Phillips were featured in Ken Russell's BBC Monitor documentary film Pop Goes the Easel, which was aired on 22 March 1962.

Boty's appearance in Pop Goes the Easel marked the beginning of her brief acting career. She landed roles in an Armchair Theatre play for ITV ("North City Traffic Straight Ahead", 1962) directed by Philip Saville and an episode of the BBC series Maigret ("Peter the Lett", 1963). She also appeared on stage in Frank Hilton's comedy Day of the Prince at the Royal Court, and in Riccardo Aragno's (from the novel by Anthony Powell) Afternoon Men at the New Arts Theatre. (Boty, a regular on the club scene in London, was also a dancer on Ready Steady Go!). Although acting was lucrative, it was a distraction from painting, which remained her main priority. Yet the men in her life encouraged her to pursue acting, as it was a more conventional career choice for women in the early 1960s. The popular press picked up on her glamorous actress persona, often undermining her legitimacy as an artist by referring to her physical appearance. Scene ran a front-page article in November 1962 that included the following remarks: "Actresses often have tiny brains. Painters often have large beards. Imagine a brainy actress who is also a painter and also a blonde, and you have Pauline Boty."

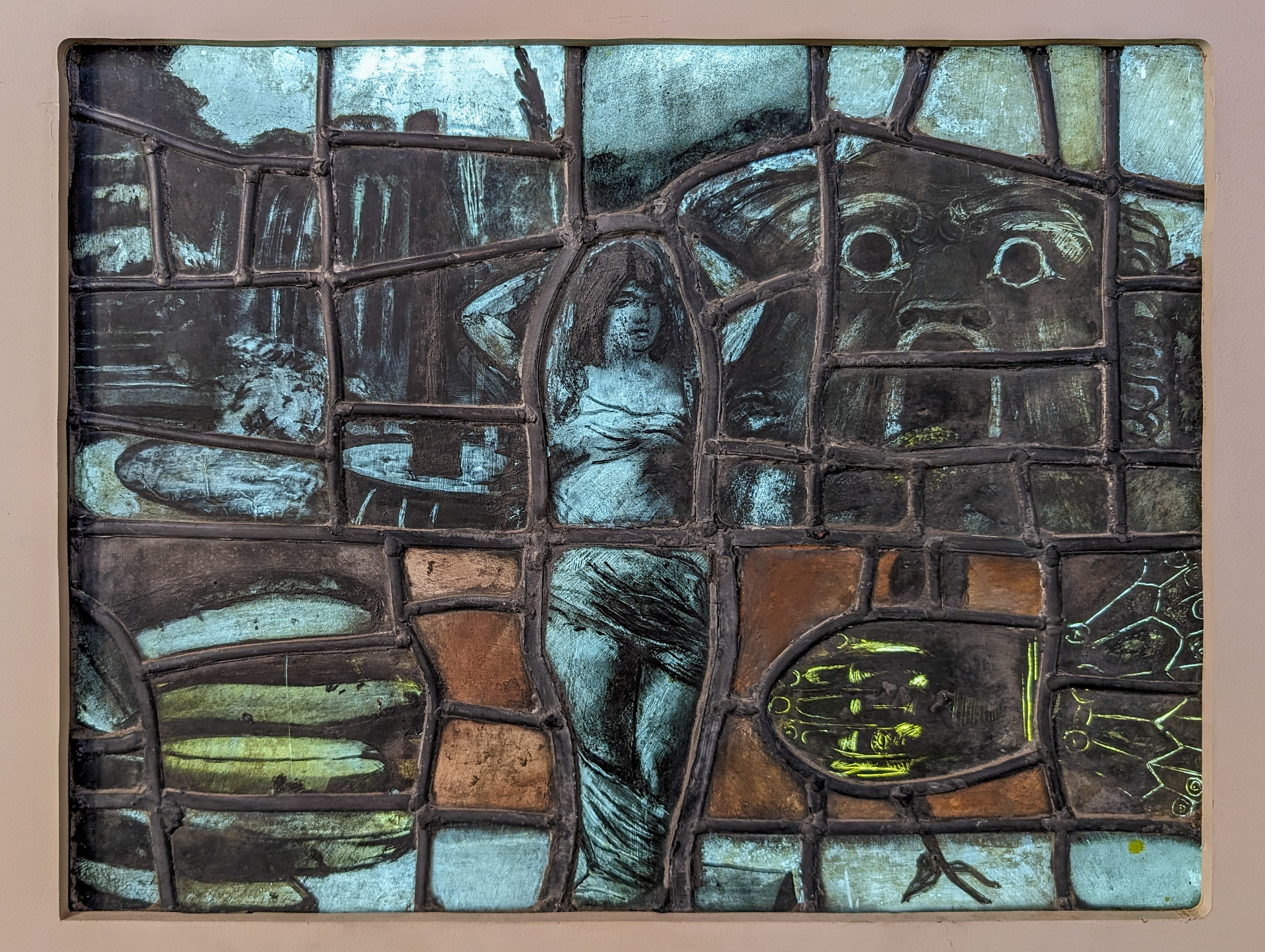
Siren in stained glass c. 1958 – c. 1962

Her unique position as Britain's only female Pop artist gave Boty the chance to redress sexism in her life as well as her art. Her early paintings were sensual and erotic, celebrating female sexuality from a woman's point of view. Her canvases were set against vivid, colourful backgrounds and often included close-ups of red flowers, presumably symbolic of the female sex. She painted her male idols—Elvis, French actor Jean-Paul Belmondo, British writer Derek Marlowe—as sex symbols, just as she did actresses Monica Vitti and Marilyn Monroe. Like Andy Warhol, she recycled publicity and press photographs of celebrities in her art. Her 1963 portrait of her friend Celia Birtwell, Celia Birtwell and Some of her Heroes, shows the textile designer surrounded by a Peter Blake painting, a David Hockney portrait and an image of Elvis Presley. She exhibited in several more group shows before staging her first solo exhibition at Grabowski Gallery in the autumn of 1963. The show was a critical success. Boty continued to take on additional acting jobs. She was a presenter on the radio programme Public Ear in 1963–64, and in the following year, she was typecast yet again in the role of 'the seductive Maria' in a BBC serial.

In June 1963 she married the literary agent Clive Goodwin (1932–1977) after a ten-day romance. Her marriage disappointed others such as Peter Blake and her married lover, the television director Philip Saville, whom she had met towards the end of her student days and had worked for. (Their affair is said to have provided the material for a screenplay by Frederic Raphael for the movie Darling.) Boty and Goodwin's Cromwell Road flat became a central hang-out for many artists, musicians, and writers, including Bob Dylan, David Hockney, Peter Blake, Michael White, Kenneth Tynan, Troy Kennedy Martin, John McGrath, Dennis Potter and Roger McGough. (Dylan was brought to England by Philip Saville, who collected him from London Airport with Boty; Dylan stayed in Boty's flat.) Goodwin, later a member of the founding editorial team of the radical journal Black Dwarf, is said to have encouraged Boty to include political content in her paintings.

Her paintings did become more overtly critical over time. Countdown to Violence depicts a number of harrowing current events, including the Birmingham riot of 1963, the Assassination of John F. Kennedy and the Vietnam War. Cuba Si (1963) references the Cuban revolution. The collage painting It's a Man's World I (1964) juxtaposes images of male icons The Beatles, Albert Einstein, Lenin, Muhammad Ali, Marcel Proust and other men. In It's a Man's World II (1965–66) she redisplayed female nudes from fine art and soft-core pornographic sources to signify newly liberated "female eroticism". Her last known painting, BUM, was commissioned by Kenneth Tynan for Oh, Calcutta! and was completed in 1966.

=== Death ===
In June 1965 Boty became pregnant. During a prenatal exam, she was discovered to have a cancerous tumour (malignant thymoma). She refused to have an abortion and also declined radiotherapy treatment that would have harmed her unborn foetus. Instead she smoked marijuana to ease the pain of her terminal condition. She continued to entertain her friends and even sketched The Rolling Stones during her illness. On 12 February 1966 her daughter Boty (known as Katy) was born. Five months later, on 1 July 1966, Pauline Boty died at the Royal Marsden Hospital in London, at the age of 28. Her husband Clive died in 1977 aged 43. Their daughter Boty Goodwin, who was adopted by the poet Adrian Mitchell and his wife Maureen after Pauline's death, later moved to Los Angeles to study art; she died from a heroin overdose on 12 November 1995 aged 29.

== Legacy ==
After her death, Pauline Boty's paintings were stored away in a barn on her brother's farm and she was largely forgotten for nearly 30 years. The rediscovery of her work in the 1990s, owing to the efforts of curator David Mellor and academic Dr. Sue Tate, led to renewed interest in her contribution to Pop art, gaining her inclusion in several group exhibitions and a major solo retrospective. The location of some of her most sought-after paintings remains unknown.

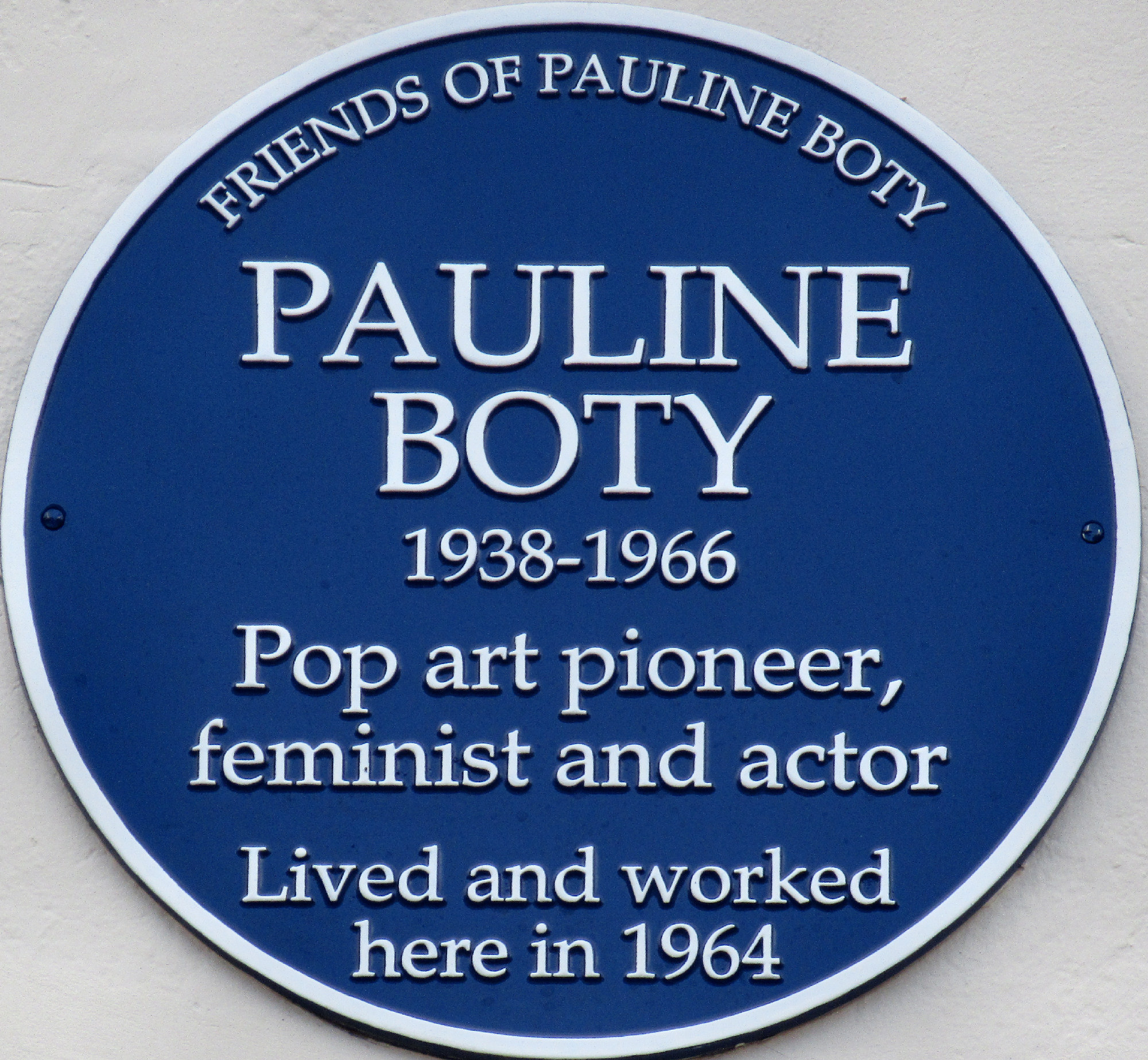
Blue plaque

In December 2013, Adrian Hamilton wrote in The Independent on Sunday, "Ignored for decades after her death – it was nearly 30 years before her first picture was shown – a proper retrospective has had to wait until this year with a show which originated in Wolverhampton and has now opened in the Pallant Gallery in Chichester. Looking at her pictures today, it is simply incredible that it has taken so long. [...] It's not a big exhibition. Given the paucity of her surviving work, it could not be otherwise. But it is one which leaves you eager for more, more of the pictures she did paint and the ones she didn't live long enough for."

Boty's life and work also form a major theme in Ali Smith's 2016 novel, Autumn.

In November 2019, the New York Times profiled Boty in their Overlooked No More series: "Pauline Boty, Rebellious Pop Artist".

On 1 July 2023, a Blue Plaque was erected for Boty at 7A Addison Avenue, Holland Park at her former home and studio. The unveiling was carried out by Natalie Gibson and Celia Birtwell with Sir Peter Blake in attendance alongside other friends, family and admirers of Boty.

Marc Kristal's biography Pauline Boty: British Pop Art's Sole Sister was published in 2023. The 2023/24 exhibition at the Gazelli Gallery included the documentary 'Boty: The Life and Times of a Forgotten Artist' and the documentary 'BOTY - I Am The Sixties' was produced by Mark Baxter in 2024.

== Exhibitions ==
- 2023: "Capturing the Moment", Tate Modern, London
- 1 December 2023 to 24 February 2024. Pauline Boty: A Portrait. London: Gazelli Art House.
- 2020: "She-Bam Pow POP Wizz! The Amazons of Pop", Musée d'art moderne et d'art contemporain, Nice, France (shown 2021 at Kunsthalle Kiel and 2022 at Kunsthaus Graz)
- 2013 retrospective exhibition of her work opened at Wolverhampton Art Gallery
- 2014: "Pauline Boty and pop art", Muzeum Sztuki, Łódź, Poland (cooperation with Wolverhampton Art Gallery)
- 2013 retrospective exhibition of her work opened at Wolverhampton Art Gallery
- 2013 – 2014 Pallant House Gallery, Chichester, West Sussex
- 2013–2014: "Pauline Boty: Pop Artist and Woman", Pallant House Gallery, Chichester, UK
- 2013: "Pauline Boty: Pop Artist and Woman", Wolverhampton Art Gallery, UK
- 2010: "Seductive Subversion: Women Pop Artists, 1958–1968", University of the Arts, Philadelphia, PA [travelling exhibition]
- 2009: "Awkward Objects": Alina Szapocznikow and Mária Bartuszová, Pauline Boty, Louise Bourgeois, Eva Hesse, and Paulina Ołowska, Museum of Modern Art in Warsaw, Poland
- 2004: "Art and the 60s: This Was Tomorrow", Tate Britain, London, UK
- 2002: "Pin-up: Glamour and Celebrity", Tate Liverpool, UK
- 1998: "Pauline Boty-The Only Blonde in the World", The Mayor Gallery & Whitford Fine Art, London, UK
- 1997: "The Pop '60s: Transatlantic Crossing", Centro Cultural de Belém, Lisbon, Portugal
- 1996: "Les Sixties: Great Britain and France 1962–1973", Musée d'Histoire Contemporaine, Paris, France and Museum and Art Gallery, Brighton, UK
- 1995: "Post War to Pop", Whitford Fine Art, London, UK
- 1993: "Pauline Boty", Mayor Gallery, London, UK
- 1993: "The Sixties Art Scene in London", Barbican Art Gallery, London, UK
- 1982: "Pop-Art" Galeria, Koszalin, Poland
- 1982: "Miedzy Hiperrealizmem a Pop Artem", Muzeum Regionalne, Radomsko, Poland
- 1981: "Realizm Spoleczny Pop-Artu", Muzeum Sztuki, Łódź, Poland
- 1976–1977 Travelling exhibition: Poland
- 1965–1966: "Spring Exhibition", Cartwright Memorial Hall, Bradford, UK
- 1965: "Contemporary Art", Grabowski Gallery, London, UK
- 1963: "Pauline Boty", Grabowski Gallery, London, UK
- 1963: "Pop Art", Midland Group Gallery, Nottingham, UK
- 1962: "New Approaches to the Figure", Arthur Jeffress Gallery, London, UK
- 1962: "New Art" – Festival of Labour, Congress House, London, UK
- 1961: "Blake, Boty, Porter, Reeve", AIA Gallery, London, UK
- 1960–1961: "Modern Stained Glass", Arts Council Tour
- 1957–1959: "Young Contemporaries", RBA Galleries, London, UK

== Permanent collections ==
- Smithsonian American Art Museum
- Tate Museum, London
- National Portrait Gallery, London
- Pallant House Gallery
- Wolverhampton Art Gallery
- The Stained Glass Museum, Ely, Cambridgeshire

== Filmography ==
Film

- 1966: Alfie ... one of Alfie's girlfriends (uncredited)
- 1965: Strangler's Web ... Nell Pretty

TV

- 1965: BBC TV, The Londoners – A Day Out for Lucy ... Patsy
- 1965: Contract to Kill (BBC TV mini-series) ... the seductive Maria Galen
- 1965: The Day of Ragnarok
- 1964: Ken Russell's Béla Bartók (BBC Monitor Series) ... Prostitute
- 1964: BBC, Short Circuit-The Park ... Pauline
- 1964: Espionage (Episode: The Frantick Rebel) ... Mistress Fleay
- 1963: Ready Steady Go! ... Dancer
- 1963: Don't Say a Word (game show) ... herself
- 1963: BBC, Maigret: Peter the Lett ... Josie
- 1962: BBC, The Face They See ... Rona
- 1962: ITV Armchair Theatre (Episode: North City Traffic Straight Ahead) ... Anna
- 1962: Ken Russell's Pop Goes the Easel (BBC Monitor Series) ... Herself

== Bibliography ==
- Sue Tate Pauline Boty: Pop Artist and Woman (life and works) Wolverhampton Art Gallery with the Paul Mellon Foundation, 2013
- Marc Kristal Pauline Boty: British Pop Art's Sole Sister, Frances Lincoln. ISBN 978-0-7112-8754-9
- Sue Watling; David Alan Mellor (1998). Pauline Boty, 1938–1966: The Only Blonde in the World. London: AM Publication. ISBN 978-0-9509896-2-4.
- Minioudaki, K. (2007). "Pop's Ladies and Bad Girls: Axell, Pauline Boty and Rosalyn Drexler". Oxford Art Journal. 30 (3): 402–430. doi:10.1093/oxartj/kcm023. ISSN 0142-6540.
- Adam Smith, Now You See Her: Pauline Boty, First Lady of British Pop, 2002
- Sue Tate (2007). "Re-occupying the Erotic Body: The Paintings and 'Performance' of Pauline Boty". In Rumens, Nick; Alejandro Cervantes-Carson (eds.). Sexual politics of desire and belonging. Amsterdam: Rodopi. ISBN 978-9042022393. OCLC 182839294.
- A. M. Kokoli, ed. (2008). "'Forward Via a Female Past': Pauline Boty and the Historiographical promise of the Woman Pop Artist". Feminism Reframed. Newcastle, UK: Cambridge Scholar Publishing. pp. 177–205.
- Sachs S.; Minioudaki K., eds. (2010). "A Transgression Too Far: Women artists and the British Pop Art Movement". Seductive Subversion: Women Pop Artists 1958–68 University of the Arts. New York and London: University of the Arts, Philadelphia and Abbeville Press. ISBN 978-0-9819119-2-2. OCLC 656365556.
- Sid Sachs and Kalliopi Minioudaki, eds. Seductive Subversion: Women Pop Artists, 1958–1968. [exhibition catalogue] University of the Arts, Philadelphia. New York and London: Abbeville Press, 2010
- Bill Smith (2006). "Latest Art" (PDF). pp. 10–15.
- Lawrence van Gelder, "Eye-Catchers", The New York Times. 26 March 2002
