= The Dotty World of James Lloyd =

The Dotty World of James Lloyd is a 1964 TV documentary directed by Ken Russell about artist James Lloyd.

Lloyd later worked with Russell on Always on Sunday.
