= Humphrey Burton =

British television presenter (1931–2025)

Sir Humphrey Burton CBE
- Born: Humphrey McGuire Burton; 25 March 1931; Trowbridge, Wiltshire, England
- Died: 17 December 2025 (aged 94)
- Occupations: Television presenter, broadcaster and producer
- Children: 6, including Clemency Burton-Hill
- Relatives: James Roscoe (son-in-law)
- Awards: BAFTA Two awards including Desmond Davis Award 1965; Four Emmies; Sony Gold Award

Sir Humphrey McGuire Burton CBE (25 March 1931 – 17 December 2025) was an English classical music television presenter, broadcaster, director, producer, impresario, lecturer and biographer of musicians. Burton was knighted in the 2020 New Year Honours for services to classical music, the arts and the media.

== Early life and career ==
Born in 1931 in Trowbridge, Wiltshire, the son of Harry (also known as Philip) Burton, assistant director of education for the county, and his wife, Kay (née Henwood), a midwife, Burton attended Long Dene, a co-educational progressive school, from 1943 until 1947, and The Judd School, Tonbridge, from 1947 until 1949.

He performed 18 months of national service in the Royal Corps of Signals before studying music and history at Fitzwilliam House, Cambridge, from 1951 until 1954. He then spent a year in France on a French Government scholarship, researching musical life in the 18th century, before joining BBC Radio as a trainee studio manager in 1955. He was seconded to the Recorded Programmes Production Unit and began regular broadcasts as a presenter of Transatlantic Turntable in 1957. The Guardian's obituary states, "Until his entry into broadcasting he was known as Bill; his mother preferred Humphrey on the basis that [as he recalled] 'it would sound well when I was knighted.'"

The following year, he transferred to BBC Television, joining the production team of the new arts programme Monitor. He directed many studio programmes and film documentaries, working alongside Ken Russell, John Schlesinger, David Jones and Peter Newington, rising to the post of editor, in succession to his mentor Huw Wheldon, in 1962.

== Broadcasting career ==
Burton helped spearhead the BBC's preparation for the opening of BBC2, launched in April 1964, and the following year was appointed the BBC's first Head of Music and Arts (1965–67). In 1965, he won BAFTA's top award of the year (then SFTA) for creativity in music programming; credits include The Golden Ring, Elgar (producer), Master Class and Workshop. He then worked for eight years in commercial television, being one of the founder members of London Weekend Television, where after a spell as head of Drama, Arts and Music he resigned from management and devised, edited and presented the award-winning arts series Aquarius (1970–75), the forerunner of The South Bank Show. His direction credits included The Great Gondola Race and Alfred Brendel: Anatomy of a Recording.

Burton returned to the BBC for a second term as head of Music and Arts, creating such long-running strands as Young Musician of the Year and Arena, until 1981, when aged 50 he resigned from management to concentrate on direction. He stayed with the BBC until 1988 as editor of performance programmes and director of Proms and opera relays from the Royal Opera House, English National Opera, Glyndebourne, and Scottish Opera (Bernstein's Candide). For Omnibus he directed the world premiere of Andrew Lloyd Webber's Requiem in 1985 and produced The Making of West Side Story.

Freelance work had begun in 1970, when he produced and directed an Emmy-winning bicentennial portrait entitled Beethoven's Birthday for CBS TV. For later showings on A&E, and for VHS and DVD release, the program was retitled Bernstein on Beethoven: A Celebration in Vienna.

A 20-year association with conductor/composer Leonard Bernstein followed; he directed over 170 documentaries and filmed concerts, including cycles of symphonies by Mahler, Beethoven, Schumann, Brahms and many others, as well as Bernstein's own compositions. The films were almost all produced for the Munich company Unitel. He also worked with other great conductors, including Karajan, Solti, Kleiber, and Abbado, and with pianists including Pogorelic, Brendel and Zimerman.

He was guest director of the Hollywood Bowl in 1983 and director of Tanglewood's 70th Bernstein Birthday Bash in 1988. He served as Artistic Adviser to the Barbican 1988–91, where he was responsible for the award-winning festival of Scandinavian arts entitled Tender is the North. After Bernstein died in 1990, Burton spent three years in New York researching and writing his biography, Leonard Bernstein - A Life 1994. Other musician biographies followed: Yehudi Menuhin in 2000 and William Walton – The Romantic Loner (OUP 2002, co-authored with Maureen Murray). For the decade after his return from New York he worked in the US and Europe as director and/or programme presenter of classical music (for Classic FM and Radio 3), opera, ballet, documentaries and music competitions. He celebrated his 70th birthday by conducting Verdi's Requiem at the Royal Albert Hall, raising £75,000 for the prostate research charity. Later in 2001 he moved to Aldeburgh, where he has been President of the Aldeburgh Music Club since 2010 and has presented fifteen seasons of Matinées Musicales at the local cinema. In 2011, he mounted a Schubert weekend to mark his 80th birthday.

He was awarded four Emmies and two British Academy Television Awards, the Royal Television Society's silver medal and a Sony Gold Award. He was appointed a CBE in the Millennium Honours 2000.

== Personal life and death ==
In 1957, Burton married Gretel Davis, but the couple later divorced. In 1970, he married Swedish radio and television presenter Christina Hansegård. He had six children: Chris Hockey (born 1949); Clare Dibble, television producer and schoolteacher (born 1959); Matthew Burton, actor-director-drama teacher (born 1962); Helena Burton, artist and art therapist (born 1968); Lukas Burton, television and film composer and producer (born 1971); and Clemency Burton-Hill (mother: Gillian Hawser), a television and radio presenter (born 1981).

Burton died at his home on 17 December 2025, at the age of 94.

== Bibliography ==
=== Books ===
Sole author

- Leonard Bernstein. New York: Doubleday, 1994. ISBN 0-385-42345-4 (10). ISBN 978-0-385-42345-8 (13).
- Yehudi Menuhin: A Life. Boston: Northeastern UP, 2001. ISBN 1-55553-465-1 (10). ISBN 978-1-55553-465-3 (13).
- In My Own Time: An Autobiography. Boydell & Brewer, 2021. ISBN 1783274816 (10). ISBN 978-1783274819 (13).

Co-author

- William Walton: The Romantic Loner: A Centenary Portrait Album. Oxford: Oxford UP, 2001. ISBN 0-19-816235-9 (10). ISBN 978-0-19-816235-3 (13). (With Maureen Murray.)

== Videography ==
- Mozart, W.A.: Great Mass in C minor, Exsultate, jubilate and Ave verum corpus, with Arleen Augér, Frederica von Stade, Frank Lopardo, Cornelius Hauptmann, the Bavarian Radio Symphony Orchestra and the Bavarian Radio Chorus, conducted by Leonard Bernstein, Deutsche Grammophon DVD, 00440–073–4240, 2006

== Sources ==
- Chapin, Schuyler. Leonard Bernstein: Notes from a Friend. New York: Walker & Company, 1992. ISBN 0-8027-1216-9 (10). ISBN 978-0-8027-1216-5 (13).
- Culshaw, John: 'Ring Resounding' London Secker and Warburg 1965
