= The Lion's Mouth =

2000 British film

The Lion's Mouth is a 2000 British film directed by Ken Russell. During production it was known as Leomania.

Russell made it in his own house with his own money for a budget of £20,000. It launched Russell on a series of self financed "underground" films, a return to the sort of movies he made at the start of his career.

During the making of the film Russell said "I haven't enjoyed the experience of making a film since Amelia and the Angel. Everything in between had its ups and downs, but somehow I think this is really me, this film... I'm totally responsible for it and I didn't want to do it any other way."

== Plot ==
The film was inspired by the Reverend Harold Davidson, the Rector of Stiffkey, a rector in the 1930s who helped prostitutes.

== Cast ==
- Diana Laurie as Josephine Heatherington
- Ken Russell as Ken the Clown
- Tulip Junkie as Nippy / Lion
- Emma Millions as Tart / Androcles
- Nipper as The dog

== Production ==
When no actor seemed suitable for the role of the vicar, Russell decided to change the film to be a Citizen Kane style investigation of a journalist into the history of the vicar.
