= Peep Show =

Peep Show or Peepshow may refer to:

- Peep show, a live sex show or pornographic film viewed through a slot
- Raree show, an exhibition of pictures or objects viewed through a hole

== Music ==
- Peep Show (Alternative TV album), 1987
- Peep Show (Goudie album), 2000
- Peepshow (album), by Siouxsie & the Banshees, 1988
- "Peep Show", a song by 50 Cent from Curtis, 2007
- "Peep Show", a song by SikTh by The Trees Are Dead & Dried Out Wait for Something Wild, 2003
- Peepshow tour, a concert tour by Barenaked Ladies, 2003

== Television ==
- Peep Show (British TV series), a 2003–2015 sitcom
- Peep Show (Canadian TV series), a 1975–1976 drama anthology program
- The Peep Show, a faux chat show segment hosted by professional wrestler Christian
- Peep and the Big Wide World

== Other uses ==
- Peepshow (burlesque), a burlesque show created by Jerry Mitchell
- Peepshow (comics), a comics series by Joe Matt
- Peep Show (film), a 1956 short film by Ken Russell
- Peep Show, a film by Noel Lawrence (as J. X. Williams)
- Peepshow, a poetry collection by Valerie Grosvenor Myer
- Peepshow (novel), a 2004 novel by Leigh Redhead
