= John Betjeman: A Poet in London =

John Betjeman: A Poet in London is a 1959 British short film about John Betjeman, directed by Ken Russell for the BBC's Monitor television series. It was Russell's first professional film. He later made a second documentary featuring Betjeman, titled Journey into a Lost World, first shown in 1960.
