= Pop Goes the Easel (1962 film) =

1962 British documentary by Ken Russel

- Directed by: Ken Russell
- Country of origin: United Kingdom
- Original language: English

Production
- Producer: Huw Wheldon
- Editor: Allan Tyrer
- Running time: 42 minutes
- Production company: BBC TV

Original release
- Network: BBC
- Release: 25 March 1962

Pop Goes the Easel is a 1962 British documentary directed by Ken Russell commissioned by the BBC's Monitor arts' television series. It is a portrait of pop artists Peter Blake, Derek Boshier, Pauline Boty and Peter Phillips in a style owing a little to their own.

The documentary was preceded by an introduction from Huw Wheldon, who noted that pop culture was "a world which you can dismiss if you feel so inclined as tawdry and second rate, but a world in which everyone to some degree lives whether they like it or not".
