= Bartok (film) =

1964 film by Ken Russell

Bartok is a 1964 British television film about Béla Bartók. It was directed by Ken Russell.

It was one of a series of Russell films on composers.

== Cast ==
- Boris Ranevsky as Bartók
- Pauline Boty as prostitute
- Sandor Elès as client
- Peter Brett as Bluebeard
- Rosalind Watkins as Judith
