= James Lloyd (artist) =

English painter

Frederick James Lloyd (12 October 1905 in Alsager, England – 1974) was an English artist. He became famous for his paintings, mostly of animals and country landscapes.

He was the first living self-taught artist to have a painting hung at the Tate in London, titled Cat and Mouse.

== Life ==
Lloyd was the son of a policeman who had taken up farming. He had worked on his father's farm until the age of 19, when he too joined the police force. He had a variety of jobs before the war: gas-works stoker; bus conductor; builder's labourer; lamp-lighter; until he was accepted for the famous and exclusive British Army regiment of the Coldstream Guards. He served with distinction in his regiment overseas during the war. On demobilisation he married Nancy, she was a teenager and he in his forties, he returned to the land and took a job as a wagoner in Shropshire. He, his wife and four children bought a small holding at Triangle, near Halifax, in the Pennines. Although he had done some paintings as a young man, it was not until he was forty, that he began to paint in earnest.

He and his family moved to Skirpenbeck, East Riding of Yorkshire in 1950. He took on the job as a cowman. There were now so many paintings, laboriously constructed dot by dot (pointillism). His wife Nancy decided it was time that Lloyd's work was seen by more people. Without telling her husband she wrote to Sir Herbert Read and he paid Lloyd a visit to see his paintings, and bought a couple of them. Herbert Read sent some to various galleries in London.

In 1958 Lloyd held his first one-man show at (the late) Arthur Jeffress Gallery in London. All but 2 of the 32 paintings being held were sold within hours of opening.

The rapidly expanding Lloyd family (eight children, and one who died young) moved to a council house further into the village and Lloyd took a job with the Derwent Plastics Company at Stamford Bridge, the money was better and the hours easier, he did shift work so he could paint by day and work by night. He devoted all his spare time (except for the pub) to painting. He never painted in a studio; he would usually just paint in the living room with the children playing around him.

By the early 1960s he had stopped working at the Derwent Plastics factory to paint full-time. In 1961 he was commissioned by the York City Art Gallery under the Evelyn Award Scheme to paint the view of Cliffords Tower, York, for the gallery's collection. L.S. Lowry also produced a painting of Cliffords Tower. At the closure of Arthur Jeffress Gallery, Lloyd was taken on by the Portal Gallery, where his paintings still remain. His first one-man show there was in 1964 followed by others in 1966, 1968 and 1971. He never titled or dated his paintings.

In 1963 Eric Lister of the Portal Gallery introduced Lloyd to film director Ken Russell. The result was that the BBC Monitor series made a television documentary film about his life and work, The Dotty World of James Lloyd. Two years later Lloyd was chosen to play (with no previous acting experience) the part of Henri Rousseau in Ken Russells 'Monitor' film on the great French naive painter, Always on Sunday.

The photographer David Bailey bought several paintings by Lloyd and became a very good friend. When his book Goodbye Baby and Amen, an album of Bailey's portraits of celebrities of the 1960s was published, Lloyd featured prominently. He was also commissioned to paint a picture for the 1969/1971 book The Beatles Illustrated Lyrics.

Other galleries who acquired his work were Leeds City Art Gallery, Bowes Museum and Thomas's College, York. He was also noticed by collectors abroad and his work was collected by Museums and Galleries as far apart as Caracas, Venezuela, and Zacreb, Yugoslavia. He won the International Best Primitive Painter Award in 1973, with his painting Boy with Horse.
