= The Boy Friend (1971 film) =

1971 British film by Ken Russell

- Theatrical release poster
- Directed by: Ken Russell
- Screenplay by: Ken Russell
- Based on: The Boy Friend by Sandy Wilson
- Produced by: Ken Russell; Harry Benn
- Starring: Twiggy; Christopher Gable
- Cinematography: David Watkin
- Edited by: Michael Bradsell
- Music by: Peter Maxwell Davies
- Production company: Russflix
- Distributed by: Metro-Goldwyn-Mayer/EMI Films
- Release dates: 16 December 1971 (New York City); 3 February 1972 (London)
- Running time: 137 minutes
- Country: United Kingdom
- Language: English
- Budget: $2.3 million
- Box office: $3 million

The Boy Friend is a 1971 British musical comedy film written and directed by Ken Russell, based on the 1953 musical of the same name by Sandy Wilson. The film stars Twiggy, Christopher Gable, Tommy Tune, and Max Adrian, with an uncredited appearance by Glenda Jackson.

Metro-Goldwyn-Mayer made extensive edits for its American release, reducing its runtime to 109 minutes. The truncated material was restored for a 1987 re-release. The Boy Friend was released on DVD on 12 April 2011.

== Plot ==
In the late 1920s at the low-rent, provincial Theatre Royal in Portsmouth, Hampshire new assistant stage manager Polly Browne helps the company prepare for a Saturday matinée performance of The Boy Friend; there is only a small audience, and the show's star Rita Monroe is absent. Among the company are former American child dancer Tommy, and the handsome but distant Tony Brockhurst as the male lead. Learning that Monroe has broken her ankle, director Max Mandeville has Polly take her place as she knows the show by heart. The situation is further complicated by the arrival of Hollywood talkie director Mr. De Thrill, who is considering adapting The Boy Friend to film. The musical follows the romantic escapades of "Polly" after meeting the handsome "Tony" at a continental villa, both wealthy but pretending poverty to find true love; the events of the musical begin intertwining with backstage happenings.

De Thrill's presence makes Max anxious−prompting him to imagine parts of the musical as a lavish Hollywood production−and escalates existing tensions within the company, especially ambitious chorus girl Maisie. The nervous Polly is helped through the first act by sympathetic stage hands and fellow performers, and receives further encouragement from Monroe when she visits backstage. As "Polly" and "Tony" conduct their comedic romance on-stage, the real Polly and Tony show attraction for each other. At the intermission, Polly sings to a picture of him; she is heard by De Thrill, although Maisie sabotages his talk with her in an effort to ingratiate herself. When Polly sees Tony apparently flirting with chorus girl Dulcie, she assumes the worst and is heartbroken.

During the second and third acts, Polly remains depressed and suspicious of Tony. Tommy and the other men in the company take revenge on Maisie for her antics by ruining their joint number on-stage, and the attempts to impress De Thrill grow increasingly farcical. During the show's finale, the unhappy Polly—whose character is dressed as Pierrette for a party and bereft of her Pierrot-costumed lover—is comforted by Tony on stage in his role. In an unscripted section, Tony and Dulcie present Polly with a cake on which Tony declares his love for Polly. This brings both the real life and musical love stories to a happy conclusion.

As the show ends, Polly is congratulated by most of the company and notices a genuinely moved Monroe leaving the audience in tears, realizing that she has done well as an understudy. Ultimately De Thrill decides not to adapt the show, but leaves his card for Polly inviting her to Hollywood. Maisie is certain De Thrill will take her, but De Thrill recognizes Tommy as his long lost son and departs with him instead. Polly is given De Thrill's card, but decides to stay with Tony.

== Cast ==
- Twiggy as Polly Browne
- Christopher Gable as Tony Brockhurst
- Max Adrian as Max Mandeville a.k.a. Mr. Max / Lord Hubert Brockhurst
- Bryan Pringle as Percy Parkhill / Percy Browne
- Murray Melvin as Alphonse
- Moyra Fraser as Moyra Parkhill / Madame Dubonnet
- Georgina Hale as Fay
- Sally Bryant as Nancy
- Vladek Sheybal as De Thrill
- Tommy Tune as Tommy
- Brian Murphy as Peter
- Graham Armitage as Michael
- Antonia Ellis as Maisie
- Caryl Little as Dulcie
- Anne Jameson as Mrs. Peter
- Catherine Willmer as Catherine Max / Lady Catherine Brockhurst
- Robert La Bassier as chauffeur
- Barbara Windsor as Rosie / Hortense
- Glenda Jackson as Rita (uncredited)

== Production ==
=== Development ===
The musical premiered on stage in November 1954 and had been a notable success, running for over five years in London. Its subsequent Broadway production, which featured Julie Andrews, helped make her a star. MGM bought the film rights in February 1957. Ernie Martin and Cy Feur were attached to produce with the cast to include either Debbie Reynolds or Carol Channing. New songs were to be added, and some of the script changed. In January 1958, they announced the film would be made that year with Debbie Reynolds. However, the film was not made.

In February 1961, Reynolds said the project was one of three at MGM she would "love to do" (the others being Jumbo and The Elsie Janis Story), but "they're just not making musicals these days."

A few years later, Ross Hunter, who had tried to buy the project originally but had been outbid by MGM, offered to buy the rights from the studio but it wanted $450,000 for it. Hunter decided to make his own musical in the same vein resulting in Thoroughly Modern Millie.

In June 1970, MGM and EMI announced they would make four films together, with each company putting in £1 million. The movies were Get Carter, The Go-Between, The Last Run and The Boy Friend. Robert Littman was head of MGM's European operations. The film was made after Get Carter and The Go Between and was the first movie from the newly formed EMI-MGM Film Productions Ltd."

Dan Ireland thought Russell was motivated to make the film in part in response to the controversy of The Devils (1971). Russell admitted he did it "to prove to people I'm not totally deranged. I love the innocence and charm of musicals."

Filming started in April 1971, only ten days after Russell finished work on The Devils. During filming, Russell said the film was "supposed to be a holiday after The Devils—just entertainment. It's turned out to be the hardest picture I've ever made."

=== Leads ===
==== Twiggy ====
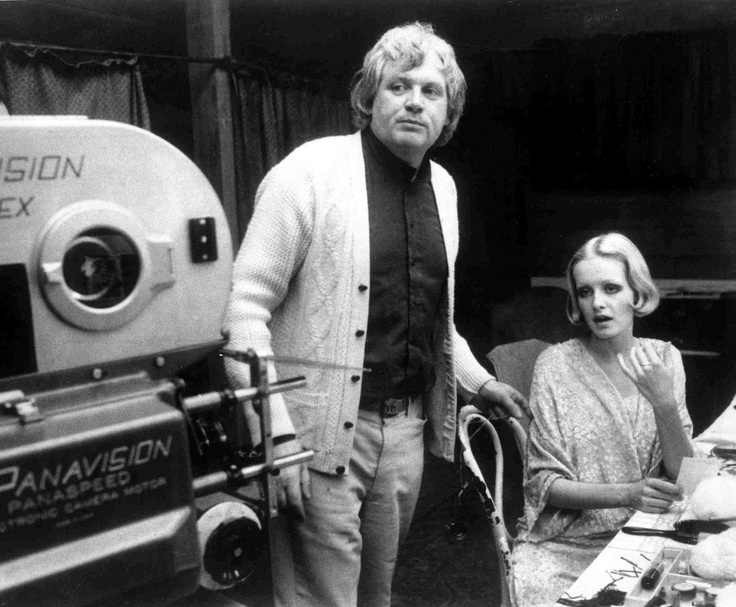
Ken Russell and Twiggy on the set of The Boy Friend

Ken Russell was friends with the model Twiggy, who wanted to get into films—in 1968 they announced she would star in The Wishing Tree directed by Russell, but it was not made. Twiggy had been one of the most famous models in the world, but had retired 18 months before the film.

Twiggy had seen a revival of The Boy Friend and suggested that Russell direct her in a film version. Russell says he told a journalist as a joke that he was doing it, and an executive from MGM contacted him saying they had the rights for years, but could never figure out how to do it. The executive felt that the "twenties stylisation" of the musical worked on stage, but not on film. "It's mannered and stilted and the cardboard characters never come alive". They asked Russell if he was interested in trying an adaptation and he agreed. "Honestly, that's how it all came about," said Russell.

MGM were concerned about Twiggy, but Russell said, "give me three months and I'll have her dancing like Ginger Rogers and singing like Judy Garland."

Her boyfriend and manager, Justin de Villeneuve, acted as producer. "Justin swears she can do anything," said Sandy Wilson before filming began, "and I would think he's probably right."

"The dancing nearly killed me," said Twiggy.

==== Christopher Gable ====
The male lead was Christopher Gable, who, suffering from a chronic condition in his feet, had left the Royal Ballet to pursue a career in acting.

Gable recalled: "Twiggy was just great; she may be skinny but she's tough. The musical itself was not enjoyable. By a musical's very nature, one has to be relentlessly cheery, the kind of person who always smiles, and, therefore, always dances. After four months, you don't feel like it."

=== Music ===
Sandy Wilson's 1920s-style music was arranged by Peter Maxwell Davies, who had provided the score for The Devils. Davies added music for a dream sequence. Russell added two numbers from Singing in the Rain especially for Twiggy, "You Are My Lucky Star" and "All I Do Is Dream of You".

=== Filming ===
Filming took place over eighteen weeks, finishing in September. The big production numbers were shot at Elstree Studios in London and the rest at New Theatre Royal in Portsmouth.

"I know The Boy Friend will be one of the greatest musicals of all time," said Russell. "I only have 24 girls instead of 300, but the Busby Berkeley musical numbers and dream sequences will knock you out. I'm directing it like a tacky stage play in the provinces that is being visited by a big Hollywood director. You see the big fantasies as he visualises them in his head. It will be fantastic!"

"His main problem is containing himself," said associate producer Harry Benn. "He has so many ideas going through that brain of his, his problem - and ours - is to contain himself."

Russell said during filming that de Villeneuve was feeling jealous and left out, affecting Twiggy's performance, so Russell tried to keep him away from the set. He says at one stage, de Villeneuve threatened to pull Twiggy out of the film. This caused tension between Russell and Twiggy, although they would eventually reunite while Twiggy ended her relationship with de Villeneuve in 1973.

When the film was over Russell said "I'd always wanted to do" a musical, "but never again. It's like trying to rebuild the pyramids when everyone's forgotten how they did it. The simplest things confounded us like those marvelous dark glossy Hollywood floors. We had to try so many materials to paint the floors. We'd get the color the girls would dance on them and they'd be ruined."

De Villeneuve wanted to star Twiggy and Tommy Tune in Gotta Sing, Gotta Dance, but the film was never made. Twiggy and De Villeneuve broke up in 1973. Twiggy and Tune re-teamed on the popular show My One and Only.

=== MGM edits ===
James Aubrey, head of Metro-Goldwyn-Mayer, ordered 25 minutes be cut from the film for its U.S. release. Michael Laughlin, producer of the film Chandler, which also was cut by Aubrey, claimed Russell said he was going to Los Angeles to "murder Jim Aubrey". Russell denied this, claiming to have said he was going to Los Angeles to murder film critic Rex Reed (who had been critical of Russell), and pointed out he was making his next film, Savage Messiah, for MGM. He said if Aubrey wanted to cut the film that was his prerogative.

Among the material cut by MGM for the U.S. release was:

- two songs: "It's Nicer in Nice" and "The You-Don't-Want-to-Play-with-Me Blues"
- a seven-minute sequence where the character played by Twiggy imagines the entire cast in a bacchanal
- a running gag involving the wife (Anne Jameson) of a two-timing actor

Russell wrote the cuts meant "all the relationships in the last reel became completely meaningless."

He later claimed he should have cut the film "during the script stage but, determined to be faithful to the original show, I kept in everything! It was left to MGM, who financed the film, to do the job for me. A gorilla in boxing gloves wielding a pair of garden shears could have done a better job."

Russell was just one of several directors during this time who complained of MGM and Aubrey recutting their films.

Sandy Wilson said in a 1994 interview that he disliked the film. "I recognise some of the tunes. If it made a star out of Twiggy, well... but she's faded out long since. To give Russell his due, it didn't belong on the screen at all."

Russell later wrote of the film in his 1994 memoirs The Lion Roars:

Despite the big Busby Berkeley routines, the novelty value of the stage show, the great singing and dancing by the cast... plus the brilliant designs of Shirley Kingdon and Tony Walton, the film was a flop. The acting was too broad, the gags too laboured and the pacing too slow. I should have cut it during the script stage, but, determined to be faithful to the original show, I kept in everything!

In 1987, a version of the film was released with the 25 minutes restored.

== Reception ==
The film had simultaneous premieres in London and New York. The film had its Southeastern premiere at the Cherokee Theater in Atlanta. Models wore period fashions from the film on stage to introduce the film.

=== Box office ===
In January 1972 the Los Angeles Times reported the film was "raking in big grosses already in New York and LA." In October 1972, Russell said "what the public wants is sex and violence, not family films. I made The Boy Friend and no one went to see it." However, by that stage the film had earned $3 million in the US.

In June 1974 Jack Haley Jr of MGM said the film had made the studio "several hundreds of thousands of dollars" in profits. He put this down to the fact that the film only cost $2.2 million. "The property wasn't that expensive because it had a nice score, but no hits. Twiggy was an international personality, but other than her, there were no major expenses for talent." It also helped the film was made in England. Haley thought if it had been made in Hollywood, "the cost would have run to more than $5 million on which MGM would have taken a good sized loss."

=== Critical reception ===
Variety praised the film, observing: “If for nothing else – but film has more – Ken Russell’s screen translation of The Boy Friend is a beautiful vehicle for Twiggy, a clever young performer. It is delightful entertainment, novel and engaging.”

Roger Ebert of the Chicago Sun-Times wrote "Even when he’s not deliberately doing Berkeley takeoffs, (Ken Russell's) camera is so joyless that it undermines every scene".

Roger Greenspun wrote in The New York Times: "I am surprised to find that it is rather greatly to my taste; partly because it is often as witty as it is elaborate, partly because it works its variations on the fully recognizable and still quite wonderful Sandy Wilson words and music, and partly because it is supported by a charming and energetic cast".

In 1973, Fred Astaire said "I don't like it when they rib the old movies and make them look silly," specifically referring to The Boy Friend. However, according to director Richard Quine Astaire "fell in love with" Twiggy watching the film and recommended that Quine use Twiggy in W (1974).

In June 1987, Los Angeles Times film critic Kevin Thomas reviewed the restored version, declaring “It’s a delight, one of the high points of Russell’s extravagantly uneven career".

In a 2003 article for Turner Classic Movies, Felicia Feaster writes: “Despite its many charms, The Boy Friend is often seen as an inferior film to Russell's ‘serious’ dramas…But there is no denying Russell's wholly original and inventive self-reflexive approach to classic Hollywood musicals. Not content to merely honor those films, Russell also gives The Boy Friend a modern touch by introducing British class tension, hints of lesbianism, bawdy physical comedy and a telling comparison of film and stage craft… showing how in the moments of film fantasy that anything is possible, as opposed to the stage where rules of gravity and reality weigh more heavily. Much of the criticism…may also be due to a badly edited American release… which negatively influenced perceptions of this utterly magical film.”

Rotten Tomatoes gives the film 79%, based on 19 reviews.

=== Awards and nominations ===
Award	Category	Nominee(s)	Result	Ref.
Academy Awards	Best Music: Scoring Adaptation and Original Song Score	Peter Maxwell Davies and Peter Greenwell	Nominated	
British Academy Film Awards	Best Actor in a Supporting Role	Max Adrian	Nominated	
Golden Globe Awards	Best Motion Picture – Musical or Comedy		Nominated	
Golden Globe Awards	Best Actress in a Motion Picture – Musical or Comedy	Twiggy	Won	
Golden Globe Awards	Most Promising Newcomer – Female	Twiggy	Won	
National Board of Review Awards	Top Ten Films		2nd Place	
National Board of Review Awards	Best Director	Ken Russell	Won	
Writers Guild of America Awards	Best Comedy – Adapted from Another Medium	Ken Russell	Nominated	
