= Vaughan Williams: A Symphonic Portrait =

Vaughan Williams: A Symphonic Portrait is a 1983 British TV film directed by Ken Russell about Vaughan Williams.

The New York Times said "the film is crammed with lovely touches". Novelist Julian Barnes, then television critic for The Observer, called it "predictable".
