= Watch the Birdie (documentary) =

1963 British documentary

Watch the Birdie is a 1963 British documentary directed by Ken Russell. It looks at photographer David Hurn.
