= The Fall of the Louse of Usher =

- DVD cover
- Directed by: Ken Russell
- Written by: Ken Russell
- Based on: The Fall of the House of Usher by Edgar Allan Poe
- Produced by: Ken Russell
- Starring: James Johnston
- Music by: James Johnston
- Release date: 2002
- Running time: 85 minutes
- Country: United Kingdom
- Language: English

The Fall of the Louse of Usher is a 2002 British arthouse horror comedy film written and directed by Ken Russell. The film is loosely based on several Edgar Allan Poe stories, notably the 1839 short story "The Fall of the House of Usher". This was Russell's final theatrical film before his death.

== Plot ==
Rock star Roddy Usher is confined to an insane asylum after murdering his wife. During his time there he is given various shock treatments by Nurse Smith and Dr. Calahari, resulting in a series of bizarre and nightmarish adventures.

== Style ==
The Fall of the Louse of Usher features many of Russell's trademarks including sexuality (often taken to extremes such as the showing of an inflatable doll orgy sequence), musical sequences and over-the-top acting. The film incorporates musical and comedy elements, with scenes exaggerating the cheapness of the props, despite primarily being a horror film.

== Reception ==
Critics generally agreed that the film was not as polished as Russell's earlier work. For example, Paul Higson of The Zone website called the production design "kindergarten level".
