= Your Honour, I Object! =

1987 British documentary film

Your Honour, I Object! is a 1987 British documentary about the legal dispute between Ken Russell and Bob Guccione over an aborted attempt to film Moll Flanders.

Russell wanted to make a version of Flanders with an unknown, Janice Flanders, in the lead. The film was to be financed by Bob Guccione. Russell wrote a script but Guccione rewrote it and Russell pulled out of the project. Guccione sued Russell for a million dollars, and the director hired lawyer Richard Golub to defend him in exchange for Russell directing a video clip starring Golub. Russell won and kept his fee of $125,000. The incident was turned into a documentary.
