= The Planets (film) =

The Planets is a 1983 TV film directed by Ken Russell based on Gustav Holst's musical suite of the same name. It was made specially for The South Bank Show, the weekly arts programme of the ITV network in Britain. It is a wordless collage that matches stock footage to each of the seven movements of the Holst suite. John Coulthart wrote "familiar Russell obsessions appear: Nazis, naked women and the inevitable crucifixion." After essentially disappearing for decades, in 2016 the film was re-released on DVD by Arthaus Musik.

It was also known as Ken Russell's view of "The Planets".
