= Nancy Thomas =

British television producer (1918–2015)

Nancy Thomas (23 August 1918 – 7 January 2015) was a British television producer known for her work within the Talks Department of BBC Television.

Thomas was born in Ranikhet, British India, to Charles D'Arcy Bingham and Bertha (née Birkbeck). Her father had been stationed as an army colonel in Ranikhet, a hill station located in the present-day state of Uttarakhand. She was sent back to the United Kingdom as a child, where she lived with relatives and attended the Berkhamsted School for Girls in Hertfordshire. After leaving school she trained and worked as a shorthand typist, and in 1935 joined the National Gallery in London where she worked for Kenneth Clark, then its director.

Thomas was among the few women who worked in production at the BBC's Lime Grove Studios during the 1950s. Thomas produced programming presented by David Attenborough and Huw Wheldon. Thomas was known for her work with the BBC's arts programming, especially Monitor, which Wheldon edited, contributing pieces on art, architecture, and sculpture.
