= Always on Sunday =

1965 British television film

Always on Sunday is a 1965 British television film directed by Ken Russell about Henri Rousseau. It was written by Russell and Melvyn Bragg for the Monitor series. Russell's first fully dramatised biopic, the narrator was Oliver Reed.

The part of Rousseau was played by painter James Lloyd who had never acted before. Russell said he would not have made the film had Lloyd not so closely resembled Rousseau. The director said: "Not only is there a strong physical resemblance but he and Rousseau are very much alike in character - strong and gentle."

== Reception ==
The Guardian said it was made with "remarkable imaginative pungency".
