= Christopher Gable =

English ballet dancer, choreographer, and actor (1940–1998)

Christopher Gable CBE
- c. 1981
- Born: Christopher Michael Gable; 13 March 1940; London, England
- Died: 23 October 1998 (aged 58); Yorkshire, England
- Occupations: Actor; dancer
- Spouse: Carole Needham (m. 1961)
- Children: 2

Christopher Michael Gable, CBE (13 March 1940 – 23 October 1998) was an English ballet dancer, choreographer and actor.

== Life and career ==
=== Dance career ===
Born in London, Gable studied at the Royal Ballet School, joining the Sadler's Wells Royal Ballet in 1957. He was promoted to soloist in 1959 and principal in 1961.

Gable's roles included Romeo in the Kenneth MacMillan production of Romeo and Juliet, Mercury in Offenbach's comic operetta Orpheus in the Underworld, a production that was filmed and released on DVD, and Colas in La fille mal gardée. Gable frequently partnered with Lynn Seymour. Gable suffered from a chronic rheumatoid condition in his feet and left the Royal Ballet in 1967 to pursue a career in acting.

=== Screen acting career ===
Gable appeared in a number of television and film productions directed by Ken Russell. These included Song of Summer (1968) and Dance of the Seven Veils (1970) for BBC television, and the films Women in Love (1969), The Music Lovers (1971), The Boy Friend (1971), The Lair of the White Worm (1988), and The Rainbow (1989). His other roles included John, valet and friend of Prince Edward, in the Cinderella film musical The Slipper and the Rose (1976), the composer Peter Cornelius in Wagner (1983), Mercury in the BBC television production of Orpheus in the Underworld (1983), ambiguous villain Sharaz Jek in the Doctor Who serial The Caves of Androzani (1984), and Arthur Ainsley in the miniseries A Woman of Substance (1985).

=== Return to dance ===
In 1982 Gable founded the Central School of Ballet with Ann Stannard. Five years later he was appointed Artistic Director of Northern Ballet Theatre. He transformed the small regional troupe into a company of national renown by presenting imaginative new works and staging revivals of old classics. Among the productions mounted during his eleven-year regime were Swan Lake, A Christmas Carol, The Brontes, The Amazing Adventure of Don Quixote, Dracula, Giselle, and The Hunchback of Notre Dame. Many of the projects he created later were performed by other dance companies, including the Atlanta Ballet and the Royal New Zealand Ballet.

== Personal life ==
Gable was married to dancer Carole Needham from 1961 until his death in 1998. They had two children, a son and a daughter.

== Death ==
Gable died of cancer near Halifax, Yorkshire, at the age of 58.

== Selected theatre performances ==
- Lysander in A Midsummer Night's Dream, Peter Brook's landmark production for the Royal Shakespeare Company in 1970.
- Laertes to Alan Howard's Prince Hamlet in Trevor Nunn's RSC production of Hamlet in 1970.
- Jack Absolute in The Rivals by Sheridan, one of the two opening productions at the Royal Exchange, Manchester, directed by Braham Murray in 1976, and Count Hohenzollern in The Prince of Homburg by Heinrich von Kleist, the other opening production, directed by Casper Wrede.
- John Rosmer in Rosmersholm by Henrik Ibsen, directed by Casper Wrede at the Royal Exchange, Manchester in 1981.
- Philinte in The Misanthrope by Moliere, directed by Casper Wrede at the Royal Exchange, Manchester in 1981.

He also appeared on stage in West End musical The Good Companions in 1974.

== Filmography ==
Year	Title	Role	Notes
1968	Song of Summer	Eric Fenby	
1969	Women in Love	Tibby Lupton	
1970	The Private Life of Sherlock Holmes	Danseur Nobel	Uncredited
1971	The Music Lovers	Count Anton Chiluvsky	
1971	The Boy Friend	Tony	
1976	The Slipper and the Rose	John	
1988	The Lair of the White Worm	Joe Trent	
1989	The Rainbow	Will Brangwen	(final film role)

== Honours and awards ==
In 1996 Gable was awarded a CBE for his services to British dance. The following year he was awarded the honorary degree of Doctor of Letters by the University of Bradford.
