= Peep Show (film) =

1956 short film by Ken Russell

- Directed by: Ken Russell
- Written by: Ken Russell
- Starring: Shirley Russell; Phil Evans; Mike Shaw
- Cinematography: M.C. Plomer
- Release date: 1956
- Running time: 22 minutes
- Country: United Kingdom
- Language: English

Peep Show is a 1956 British short film directed and written by Ken Russell. It was Russell's first film; he called it "a Fellini-esque bit of fun made by me, my first wife and two friends".

== Cast ==
- Shirley Russell (as Shirley Kingdon)
- Philip Evans
- Mike Shaw
- Tom Laden
- Teddy Rhodes
- Norman Dewhurst
