= A British Picture =

1989 autobiography by Ken Russell

- Cover of the revised edition, 2008
- Author: Ken Russell
- Language: English
- Subject: Performing Arts, Film, History & Criticism
- Genre: Non-fiction
- Publisher: Heinemann
- Publication date: 1989
- Publication place: United Kingdom
- Pages: 310
- ISBN: 978-1-904915-32-4

A British Picture: An Autobiography is the autobiography of the English film director Ken Russell. Published in 1989, it was reissued in a revised edition in 2008. It was published in the United States in 1991 under the title Altered States: The Autobiography of Ken Russell.

When the author Tony Fletcher requested an interview with Russell as reference for his biography of the Who drummer Keith Moon, Russell replied that he had already said everything he wanted to say about Moon in A British Picture. The book at no point mentions Moon.

== Documentary ==
Also in 1989, Russell made a 42-minute documentary film about himself for television titled A British Picture: Portrait of an Enfant Terrible.
