= Dance of the Seven Veils (film) =

- Screenplay by: Henry Reed; Ken Russell
- Directed by: Ken Russell
- Starring: Christopher Gable; Judith Paris; Kenneth Colley
- Music by: Richard Strauss
- Country of origin: United Kingdom
- Original languages: English; German

Production
- Producer: Ken Russell
- Cinematography: Peter Hall
- Editor: Dave King
- Running time: 59 minutes
- Production company: BBC

Original release
- Network: BBC1
- Release: 15 February 1970

Dance of the Seven Veils is a 1970 British television film about German composer Richard Strauss. The film, directed and produced by Ken Russell, was only screened once by the BBC. Following condemnation for its gratuitous sex scenes and the depiction of the composer as a Nazi sympathiser, Strauss' estate took out a legal injunction, banning the use of the composer's music on the film's soundtrack.

In February 2020, with the expiration of the composer's copyright after more than 70 years since Strauss died, the film was shown at a special screening event in Cumbria, England hosted by Russell's widow.

== Cast ==
- Christopher Gable as Richard Strauss
- Judith Paris as Pauline Strauss
- Kenneth Colley as Hitler
- Vladek Sheybal as Joseph Goebbels
- James Mellor as Goering
- Sally Bryant as 'Life'
- Gala Mitchell as Fallen Woman
- Rita Webb as Salome
- Imogen Claire as Salome (dancer)
- Maggy Maxwell as Potiphar's Wife
- Otto Diamant as Jewish Man

== Production ==
The film was made on location near Russell's home at Skiddaw in the Lake District. "One of the purposes of making the film was to shock complacent critics and viewers who sit in front of their sets for hours on end watching cocoa advertisements. I was simply setting out to make a film about Richard Strauss, and I felt that everything I showed was necessary for presenting my idea of this man," Russell told Peter Waymark of The Times in February 1970. "I wanted strong, hard outlines to bring out aspects of this man and his work that to my mind have been overlooked." The composer "was a self advertising, vulgar, commercial man."

== Release and reception ==
The film was shown on BBC1 on 15 February 1970. It created a sufficient outcry for 20 Conservative backbenchers to table a motion objecting to it after the television screening. It was shown at the House of Commons the following month. Huw Wheldon, then managing director of BBC Television who was present at the screening, defended the film. It was only shown once by the BBC. The Strauss estate was so outraged by the film that an injunction was taken out, banning the use of Strauss's music on the soundtrack, effectively preventing any further broadcasts because the film can be seen but it cannot be heard.

"I hated it so much" said The Observer. "I don't deny its power," wrote Nancy Banks-Smith in The Guardian. The campaigner Mary Whitehouse commented: "There was gratuitous sex and violence of the most outlandish kind".

When the copyright of Strauss' music expired, the film was reshown at Keswick Film Festival in Cumbria's Theatre by the Lake. The evening was hosted by Russell's widow, Lisi.
