= The Debussy Film =

- Written by: Melvyn Bragg; Ken Russell
- Directed by: Ken Russell
- Starring: Oliver Reed; Vladek Sheybal
- Music by: Claude Debussy
- Country of origin: United Kingdom
- Original languages: English; French

Production
- Producer: Ken Russell
- Cinematography: Ken Westbury
- Editor: Allen Tyrer
- Running time: 82 minutes
- Production company: BBC

Original release
- Network: BBC
- Release: 18 May 1965

The Debussy Film: Impressions of the French Composer (also known simply as The Debussy Film) is a 1965 British television documentary film directed by Ken Russell, and co-written by Melvyn Bragg. Produced for the BBC's Monitor, it was the first of five collaborations between director Russell and star Oliver Reed. Russell cast Reed following Reed's performance in The System.

== Plot ==
A film company shoots a dramatised account of the life of the French composer Claude Debussy.

== Cast ==
- Oliver Reed as Claude Debussy
- Vladek Sheybal as Director/Pierre Louys
- Annette Robertson as Gaby
- Iza Teller as Madame Bardac
- Penny Service as Lily

== Production ==
Debussy's estate disliked the film and prevented repeat screenings.

== Music ==
Besides some of Claude Debussy's music, The Kinks's song You Really Got Me is used in the film.
