= The Mystery of Dr Martinu =

The Mystery of Dr Martinu is a 1992 British film directed by Ken Russell about Bohuslav Martinu. The film marked Russell's return to the BBC after 22 years.

The Times said "half" the film "was vintage Ken Russell: goonish, garish and blatant, yet invigorating by the sheer zest of the film-making" but felt "having opened in scintillating style, Russell then tacked on a plodding, protracted postscript."
