= The Strange Affliction of Anton Bruckner =

The Strange Affliction of Anton Bruckner is a 1990 film directed by Ken Russell. It is a biography of Anton Bruckner.

The Guardian called it "charming".
