= Ken Russell's ABC of British Music =

Ken Russell's ABC of British Music is a 1988 British documentary directed by and featuring Ken Russell. It was broadcast as an edition of The South Bank Show on 2 April 1988. The film presents an A to Z selection of Russell's musical enthusiasms, using alphabetical coincidence to present widely contrasting subjects - Elgar and Elton John, Holst and Heavy Metal, Punk and Purcell. Participants include Russell himself introducing each letter, along with soprano Rita Cullis, Thomas Dolby, Evelyn Glennie, Nigel Kennedy, John Lill, Julian Lloyd Webber, Eric Parkin and the saxophone quartet The Fairer Sax.

Russell said: "Some people said it was the most beautiful film they'd ever seen, and others wrote it was shocking and obscene, because I showed a naked woman in a lake, an image not commonly associated with romantic music." According to Michael Brooke, writing for the BFI's Screenonline website, the film contains "several spellbinding moments - generally those where his obvious love of the subject wins out".

The film won an Emmy for best performing arts programme.
