= Amelia and the Angel =

1958 film

- Directed by: Ken Russell
- Written by: Ken Russell; Anthony G. Evans
- Produced by: Ken Russell
- Starring: Mercedes Quadros; Míka van Bloemen; Helen Ulman; E. Collins; Elisha Manasseh; Helen May
- Release date: 1958
- Running time: 26 minutes
- Country: United Kingdom
- Language: English

Amelia and the Angel is a 1958 British short film directed by Ken Russell. It was his second completed film after Peep Show. The movie was seen by Huw Wheldon and led to his offering Russell a full-time job.

== Plot ==
A schoolgirl, Amelia, attempts to find an angel costume in time to appear in her school play.

== Cast ==
- Mercedes Quadros as Amelia
- Míka van Bloemen as Mike Sniver (as Mika Van Bloemen)
- Helen Ulman as The Artist's Model
- E. Collins as The Stallholder
- Elisha Manasseh as The Artist
- Helen May as The Dancing Teacher
- Nicholas O'Brien as The Brother (as Nicolas O'Brien)

== Production ==
Russell was then a photographer who wanted to get into the film industry and thought of the idea. He says he was influenced by La Belle et Bete and The Red Balloon. Quadros was the daughter of an Uruguayan diplomat and was recommended to Russell by a friend. Russell's wife Shirley did the costumes.

Filming took two weeks and was financed by Russell himself – the budget was "peanuts... about 100 pounds" he said. Russell said Quadros "was delightful, no trouble at all – as long as I gave her scary whirlwind rides in an old, broken-down Morris 8 I had she was as good as gold. I remember she fell over on the steps of the Albert Memorial at one point and broke her hand, the poor devil. In most of the film, she has her right hand turned away from the camera."

== Reception ==
The film screened in cinemas in 1958 for the Experimental Film Committee.

Russell showed the film to Huw Wheldon at the BBC and led to Wheldon offering Russell a job on Monitor. The director later said "A lot of people who were trying to get work on Monitor at the time made films about things like the barrow-boys of Elephant and Castle. Mine was such a change from anything like that and Huw was impressed by it because it was so unusual; he wasn't expecting a film of that sort of quality.""

The film has remained popular over the years. "It's just a nice story, that's all," said Russell.
