= Keswick Film Festival =

Film festival in Keswick, Cumbria, England

The Keswick Film Festival is an annual festival held in Keswick, Cumbria, England, since 2000. It is organised by the Keswick Film Club in association with Theatre by the Lake. Festival Focus refers to it as 'Cumbria's principal general film fest'.

The festival includes the Osprey Short Film Awards, which recognise short films from local filmmakers. In 2014, the festival ran from 27 February until 2 March.

== Osprey Short Film Awards ==
The Osprey Short Film Awards are part of the Keswick Film Festival and aim to 'celebrate local film making' by showing short films from local filmmakers. The winners from both the Under 19 and Open categories are awarded Osprey Awards. News and Star called it 'an opportunity for great directors to showcase their work'. In 2014, the Osprey Short Film Awards took place on 1 March. The winners were Animals, directed by Matthew Edwards, in the Under 19 category and Little Chamonix, directed by Dom Bush, in the Open category.
