= Ken Russell =

British film director (1927–2011)

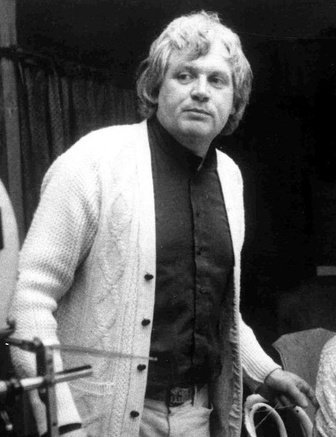
- Russell in 1971
- Born: Henry Kenneth Alfred Russell; 3 July 1927; Southampton, Hampshire, England
- Died: 27 November 2011 (aged 84); Lymington, Hampshire, England
- Occupations: Film director; screenwriter
- Years active: 1956–2011
- Spouses: Shirley Ann Kingdon (m. 1956; div. 1978) Vivian Jolly (m. 1983; div. 1991) Hetty Baynes (m. 1992; div. 1999) Lisi Tribble (m. 2001)
- Children: 8

Henry Kenneth Alfred Russell (3 July 1927 – 27 November 2011) was a British film director known for his pioneering work in television and film, and for his flamboyant and controversial style. His films were mainly liberal adaptations of existing texts, or biographies, notably of composers of the Romantic era. Russell began directing for the BBC, where he made creative adaptations of composers' lives which were unusual for the time. He also directed many feature films independently and for studios.

Russell is best known for his Academy Award-winning romantic drama film Women in Love (1969); the historical drama horror film The Devils (1971); the musical fantasy film Tommy (1975), featuring the Who; and the science fiction horror film Altered States (1980). Russell also directed several films based on the lives of classical music composers, such as Elgar, Delius, Tchaikovsky, Mahler, and Liszt.

In 2006, film critic Mark Kermode attempted to sum up Russell's achievement, calling him "somebody who proved that British cinema didn't have to be about kitchen-sink realism—it could be every bit as flamboyant as Fellini. Later in his life he turned to making low-budget experimental films such as The Lion's Mouth and Revenge of the Elephant Man, and they are as edgy and 'out there' as ever".

== Early life ==
Henry Kenneth Alfred Russell was born in Southampton, Hampshire, England, on 3 July 1927, the elder of two sons of Ethel (née Smith) and Henry Russell, a shoeshop owner. His father was distant and took out his rage on his family, so Russell spent much of his time at the cinema with his mother, who was mentally ill. He cited the films Die Nibelungen (1924) and The Secret of the Loch (1934) as two early influences.

Russell was educated at private schools in Walthamstow and at Pangbourne College, and studied photography at Walthamstow Technical College (now part of the University of East London).

=== Military service ===
Russell harboured a childhood ambition to be a ballet dancer but instead joined the Royal Air Force and the British Merchant Navy as a teenager. On one occasion he was made to stand watch in the blazing sun for hours on end while crossing the Pacific Ocean, because his mentally ill captain feared an attack by Japanese midget submarines despite the Pacific War having ended. Russell moved into television work after short careers in dance and photography.

== Career ==
=== Photography ===
In 1954, Russell started work as a local-interest freelance photographer. His series of documentary "Teddy Girl" photographs were published in Picture Post magazine in June 1955, and he continued to work as a freelance documentary photographer until 1959. During this time, he started directing short films: Peepshow (1956), Knights on Bikes (1956) and Lourdes (1959). He received much acclaim for his short Amelia and the Angel (1959), which helped secure him a job at the BBC.

=== Documentaries ===
Between 1959 and 1970, Russell directed arts documentaries for Monitor and Omnibus. Russell made Poet's London (1959, about John Betjeman), Portrait of a Goon (1959, about Spike Milligan), Gordon Jacob (1959), The Guitar Craze (1959), Variations on a Mechanical Theme (1959), Scottish Painters (1959), Marie Rambert Remembers (1960), The Strange World of Hieronymus Bosch (1960), The Miners' Picnic (1960), Architecture of Entertainment (1960), A House in Bayswater (1960), Shelagh Delaney's Salford (1960), Cranks at Work (1960, about John Cranko), The Light Fantastic (1960), Journey Into a Lost World (1960), Lotte Lenya Sings Kurt Weill (1961), Old Battersea House (1961), Portrait of a Soviet Composer (1961), London Moods (1961), Antonio Gaudi (1961), Preservation Man (1962), Mr. Chesher's Traction Engines (1962), The Lonely Shore (1962) and Watch the Birdie (1962).

Russell's films began to get longer: Pop Goes the Easel (1962) and the much admired Elgar (1962) about Sir Edward Elgar (George McGrath). Elgar was the first time that a television arts programme (Monitor) was dedicated to one artistic figure, rather than having a magazine format. It was also the first time that re-enactments were used. Russell fought with the BBC over using actors to portray different ages of the same character, instead of the traditional photograph stills and documentary footage.

=== Early features and rising fame ===
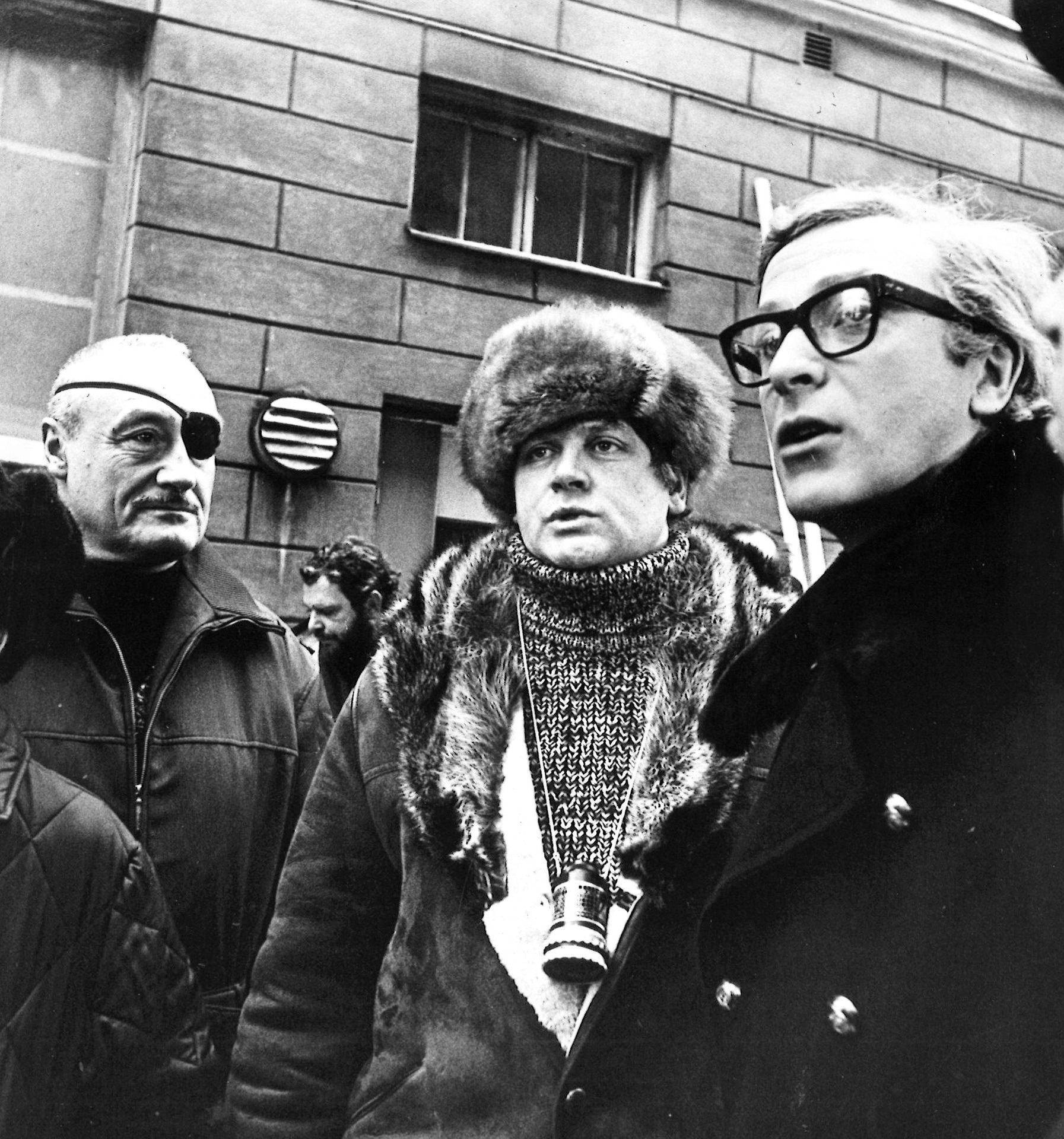
Producer Andre de Toth, Ken Russell, and Michael Caine in Helsinki during production of Billion Dollar Brain, on Sofiankatu, Finland (1967)

Russell's first feature film was French Dressing (1964), a comedy loosely based on Roger Vadim's And God Created Woman; its critical and commercial failure led Russell to work further for the BBC. For television he made the 16-minute Lonely Shore (1964), the longer Bartok (1964), about Béla Bartók (Boris Ravensky) and The Dotty World of James Lloyd (1964). In 1964, he planned to make an adaptation of Anthony Burgess' A Clockwork Orange (1962) starring the Rolling Stones but abandoned the film after the British Board of Censors advised it would not approve it.

Russell had a noted critical success with the TV movie The Debussy Film (1965), starring Oliver Reed as Claude Debussy, based on a script by Melvyn Bragg. Also well received was Always on Sunday (1965), written by Bragg, about Henri Rousseau (James Lloyd). Russell made Don't Shoot the Composer (1966), a documentary about French composer Georges Delerue. He produced and directed the highly praised Isadora Duncan, the Biggest Dancer in the World (1967), about Isadora Duncan with Vivian Pickles.

Russell's television work prompted producer Harry Saltzman to hire him to direct a feature film, Billion Dollar Brain (1967), the third Harry Palmer movie starring Michael Caine. He wanted to follow it with a biopic of Vaslav Nijinsky but Brain was a commercial disappointment. Russell returned to television for Dante's Inferno (1967) with Reed as Dante Gabriel Rossetti and Song of Summer (1968) about Frederick Delius (Max Adrian) and Eric Fenby (Christopher Gable). He once said that the best film he ever made was Song of Summer and that he would not edit a single shot.

=== Women in Love ===
In 1969, Russell directed what is considered his "signature film", Women In Love, an adaptation of D. H. Lawrence's novel of the same name about Ursula and Gudrun Brangwen, two artist sisters living in post-World War I Britain, from an Academy Award-nominated script by Larry Kramer. The film launched the movie career of Glenda Jackson (who won her first Academy Award for Best Actress for the role) and also starred Oliver Reed, Jennie Linden and Alan Bates. The film is notable for its nude wrestling scene, which broke the convention at the time that a mainstream movie could not show male genitalia. Women in Love connected with the sexual revolution and bohemian politics of the late 1960s. The film's four Academy Award nominations included Russell's only nomination for Best Director.

The film was BAFTA-nominated for the costume designs of Russell's first wife, Shirley; they collaborated throughout the 1970s. The colour schemes of Luciana Arrighi's art direction (also BAFTA-nominated) and Billy Williams' cinematography, which Russell used for metaphorical effect, are also often referred to by film textbooks.

Russell returned to television with Dance of the Seven Veils (1970) which sought to portray Richard Strauss (Christopher Gable) as a Nazi: one scene in particular showed a Jewish man being tortured while a group of SS men look on in delight, with Strauss's music as the score. The Strauss family was so outraged by the film that they withdrew all music rights. The film was effectively banned from being screened until Strauss's copyright expired in 2019. It was shown in February 2020 at the Keswick Film Festival.

=== Three films in 1971 ===
Russell followed Women in Love with a string of innovative adult-themed films which were often as controversial as they were successful. The Music Lovers (1971), a biopic of Pyotr Ilyich Tchaikovsky, starred Richard Chamberlain as a homosexual Tchaikovsky and Glenda Jackson as his wife Antonina Miliukova. The score was conducted by André Previn.

Russell followed that film with The Devils (1971), a film so provocative that its distributor, Warner Bros., refused to release it unless cuts were made; even then, the film received an X rating in both the United Kingdom and the United States, was banned in several countries, and was heavily edited for exhibition in others. Inspired by Aldous Huxley's book The Devils of Loudun (1952) and using material from John Whiting's play The Devils, the film starred Oliver Reed as Urban Grandier, a priest who stands in the way of a corrupt church and state. Helped by publicity over the more sensational scenes, featuring sexuality among nuns, the film topped British box office receipts for eight weeks. In the United States, the film, which had already been cut for distribution in Britain, was further edited but never widely released theatrically in anything like its original state; the original, uncut version has only been shown in the U.S. at film festivals and art houses. In 2017, AMC Networks-owned horror film streaming service Shudder premiered the uncut version of the film for the first time on streaming. Russell's cut was restored by Warner Bros. and the British Film Institute, and shown at the 2026 Cannes Film Festival, in anticipation of a theatrical re-release in fall 2026. British film critic Alexander Walker described the film as "monstrously indecent" in a television confrontation with Russell, leading the director to hit him with a rolled up copy of the Evening Standard, the newspaper for which Walker worked.

Russell followed The Devils with something entirely different—a reworking of the period musical The Boy Friend (1971), with large-scale Busby Berkeley-style musical sequences. Russell cast the model Twiggy, who won two Golden Globe Awards for her performance: Best Actress in a Musical or Comedy and New Star of the Year. The film was heavily cut and shorn of two musical numbers for its American release; it was not a big success.

=== The mid-1970s ===
Russell wanted to make Little Sparrow, a film about Édith Piaf, or a biopic of King Ludwig of Bavaria but neither was made. Instead, he himself provided most of the financing for Savage Messiah (1972). The film is a biopic of the painter and sculptor Henri Gaudier-Brzeska (Scott Antony), who died fighting for France at age 23, in 1915, in the trenches of the Western Front during the First World War. The film co-starred Dorothy Tutin and Helen Mirren. He announced a biopic of Sarah Bernhardt with Barbra Streisand but it was not made. Russell worked with David Puttnam on Mahler (1974), which starred Robert Powell as Gustav Mahler.

In 1975, Russell's star-studded film version of the Who's rock opera Tommy starring Roger Daltrey, Ann-Margret, Oliver Reed, Elton John, Tina Turner, Eric Clapton and Jack Nicholson, spent fourteen weeks at the No.1 spot in the UK. Two months before Tommy was released (in March 1975), Russell started work on Lisztomania (1975), another vehicle for Roger Daltrey, and for the film scoring of progressive rock keyboardist Rick Wakeman. In the film, the music of Franz Liszt is stolen by Richard Wagner. Wagner's operas then put forward the theme of the Superman. Tommy and Lisztomania were important in the rise of improved motion picture sound in the 1970s, as they were among the first films to be released with Dolby-encoded soundtracks. Lisztomania, tagged as "the film that out-Tommys Tommy", topped the British box-office for two weeks in November 1975, when Tommy was still in the list of the week's top five box-office hits.

Russell's next film, the biopic Valentino (1977), starring Rudolf Nureyev as Rudolph Valentino, also topped the British box-office for two weeks, but was not a hit in America. After this he said "nobody in Hollywood would give me even a B movie to direct."

=== Return to television and Altered States ===
Russell returned to television with the anthology films Clouds of Glory, consisting of William and Dorothy (1978), a look at the life of William Wordsworth (David Warner) and his sister Dorothy (Felicity Kendal) and The Rime of the Ancient Mariner (1978), about Samuel Taylor Coleridge (David Hemmings).

Russell went to Hollywood to make Altered States (1980), a departure in both genre and tone, in that it is Russell's only foray into science fiction. Working from Paddy Chayefsky's screenplay (based upon his novel), Russell used his penchant for elaborate visual effects to translate Chayefsky's hallucinatory story to the cinema, and took the opportunity to add his trademark religious and sexual imagery. The film had an innovative Academy Award-nominated score by John Corigliano. The film enjoyed moderate financial success, and scored with critics who had otherwise dismissed Russell's work. Roger Ebert, who had given The Devils "zero stars" and had panned Russell's early composer portraits (he did, however, give three stars to both Tommy and Lisztomania), gave it his highest rating for Russell's work (three-and-a-half stars), praising it as "one hell of a movie!"

Although the film was a financial success, Russell had difficulty making his next film. One project, Beethoven's Secret, was about to start shooting when financing fell apart at the last minute. He was attached to do the film of Evita for over a year but ultimately left the project when he refused to cast Elaine Paige as Eva Perón. A biopic of Maria Callas with Sophia Loren also failed to get financing. However, Russell found himself artistically rejuvenated when offered the chance to direct some opera. He did The Rake's Progress, Soldiers and Butterfly.

Russell's next film after Altered States was The Planets (1983), about Gustav Holst's orchestral suite of the same name. This 53-minute film was made specially for The South Bank Show, the weekly arts programme on the ITV network in Britain. It is a wordless collage that matches stock footage to each of the seven movements of the Holst suite. John Coulthart wrote "familiar Russell obsessions appear: Nazis, naked women and the inevitable crucifixion." After essentially disappearing for decades, in 2016 the film was re-released on DVD by Arthaus Musik. For The South Bank Show, Russell also made Vaughan Williams: A Symphonic Portrait (1984) about Ralph Vaughan Williams.

Russell returned to feature films with a sexual thriller, Crimes of Passion (1984), starring Anthony Perkins and Kathleen Turner, for New World Pictures. It had moderate critical success and did not perform well at the box office but was a big hit on video.

=== Opera and music videos ===
In the 1980s, Russell directed a number of operatic productions. In 1985, he directed Charles Gounod's opera Faust, loosely based on Johann Wolfgang von Goethe's play Faust. The production was staged at the Vienna State Opera, conducted by Erich Binder with Francisco Araiza, Ruggero Raimondi and Gabriela Beňačková in the main roles. In 1986, he directed a production of Arrigo Boito's Mefistofele, also based on Goethe's Faust: the production was staged at Teatro Margherita in Genoa, conducted by Edoardo Müller, with Ottavio Garaventa, Paata Burchuladze and Adriana Morelli in the main roles. He also directed successful productions of Giacomo Puccini's La bohème and Madama Butterfly.

Russell set up a company, Sitting Duck, to make music videos. "Videos are a magic new art form," he said. Among those he made were "Nikita" for Elton John and "Phantom of the Opera" for Andrew Lloyd Webber, Sarah Brightman and Steve Harley. Russell had a legal fight with Bob Guccione over an aborted attempt to film Moll Flanders, which was recounted in a 1987 BBC documentary, Your Honour, I Object! (1987).

=== Vestron Pictures ===
Russell directed Gothic (1986) with Gabriel Byrne, about the night Mary Shelley told the tale of Frankenstein. It was a hit on video for Vestron Pictures, who signed Russell to a three-picture contract. Russell did one of the segments for Aria (1987) and for British TV made Ken Russell's ABC of British Music (1988) and A British Picture (1989).

For the Vestron deal, Russell directed Salome's Last Dance (1988), a loosely adapted esoteric tribute to Oscar Wilde's controversial play Salome, which was banned on the 19th century London stage. The cult movie defines Russell's adult themed romance with the Theatre of The Poor and was also notable for the screen presence of Imogen Millais-Scott as Salome.

Russell made another two pictures for Vestron: The Lair of the White Worm (1988) with Amanda Donohoe and Hugh Grant, based on a novel by Bram Stoker, and The Rainbow (1989), another D. H. Lawrence adaptation, which also happens to be the prequel to Women in Love. Glenda Jackson played Anna Brangwen, the mother of her character Gudrun from the previous film. Russell also directed the opera Mefistofele (1989).

=== Later work ===
In the 1990 film The Russia House, starring Sean Connery and Michelle Pfeiffer, Russell made one of his first significant acting appearances, portraying Walter, an ambiguously gay British MI6 intelligence officer who discomfits his more strait-laced CIA counterparts. Russell thenceforth occasionally acted. Russell directed a segment of Women and Men: Stories of Seduction (1990) and for TV, did The Strange Affliction of Anton Bruckner (1991).

In 1991, Russell directed Whore. It was highly controversial and branded with an NC-17 rating for its sexual content. The MPAA and the theatre chains also refused to release posters or advertise a film called Whore, so for this purpose the film was re-titled If You Can't Say It, Just See It. Russell protested his film being given such a rating when Pretty Woman got an R, on the grounds that his film showed the real hardships of being a prostitute and the other glorified it.

The film Prisoner of Honor (1991) allowed Russell a further opportunity to explore his abiding interest in anti-Semitism through a factually-based account of the Dreyfus affair in the French Third Republic. The movie featured Richard Dreyfuss in the central role of Colonel Georges Picquart, the French Army investigator who exposed the army establishment's framing of the Jewish officer Captain Alfred Dreyfus (Kenneth Colley).

By the early 1990s, Russell had become a celebrity: his notoriety and persona attracted more attention than his recent work. He became largely reliant on his own finances to continue making films. Much of his work after 1990 was commissioned for television (e.g. his 1993 TV film The Mystery of Dr Martinu), and he contributed regularly to The South Bank Show including documentaries such as Classic Widows about the widows of four leading British composers; dance sections in these were choreographed by Amir Hosseinpour.

Prisoner of Honor (1991) was Russell's final work with Oliver Reed. His final film with Glenda Jackson before she transitioned from acting for politics was The Secret Life of Arnold Bax (1992). Russell directed Lady Chatterley (1993), The Mystery of Dr Martinu (1993), a version of Treasure Island (1995), Alice in Russialand (1995), Mindbender (1995), about Uri Geller (Ishai Golan), and an episode of Tales of Erotica.

In May 1995, Russell was honoured with a retrospective of his work presented in Hollywood by the American Cinematheque. Titled Shock Value, it included some of his most successful and controversial films and also several of his early BBC productions. Russell attended the festival and engaged in lengthy post-screening discussions of each film with audiences and moderator Martin Lewis, who had instigated and curated the retrospective. Russell's later films include Dogboys (1998), The Fall of the Louse of Usher (2002) and Elgar: Fantasy on a Composer on a Bicycle (2002). Efforts such as The Lion's Mouth (2000) and The Fall of the Louse of Usher (2002) have suffered from low production values (for example, being shot on video on Russell's estate, often featuring Russell himself) and limited distribution.

Russell had a cameo in the 2006 film adaptation of Brian Aldiss's novel Brothers of the Head by Keith Fulton and Louis Pepe, the directors of Lost in La Mancha. He also had a cameo in the 2006 film Colour Me Kubrick. He directed a segment for the horror anthology Trapped Ashes (2007), which also included segments directed by Sean S. Cunningham, Monte Hellman and Joe Dante. Prior to his death in 2011, Russell was reputed to be in pre-production for two films: The Pearl of the Orient and Kings X.

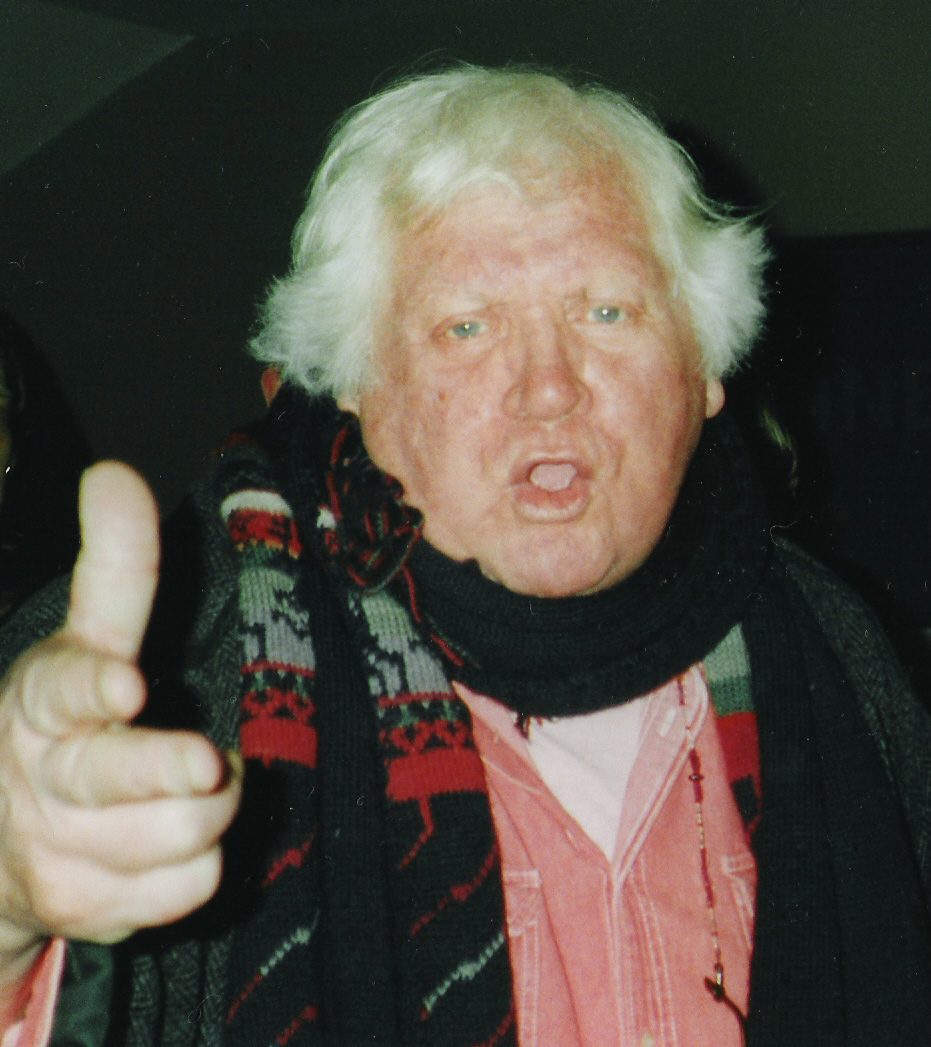
Russell in 2002

In 2003, Russell was a member of the jury at the 25th Moscow International Film Festival. He also acted in "Final Cut", an episode of the BBC Television series Waking the Dead, playing the role of Gary Raistrick, an aging director of a notorious 1960s crime drama similar to Performance.

From 2004, Russell was visiting professor at the University of Wales, Newport Film School. One of his many tasks was to advise students on the making of their graduate films. He also presented the Finest Film Awards (for graduate filmmakers of Newport) in June 2005. Russell was appointed visiting fellow at Southampton Solent University and later at the University of Southampton in April 2007, where he acted in a similar capacity to his role at the Newport Film School, until March 2008. His arrival was celebrated with a screening of the rare director's cut of The Devils hosted by Mark Kermode. Russell began production of his first full-length film in almost five years, Moll Flanders, an adaptation of Daniel Defoe's novel, starring Lucinda Rhodes-Flaherty and Barry Humphries, but a finished film failed to materialise.

In 2007, Russell produced A Kitten for Hitler, a short film hosted by the Comedybox.tv website. Russell commented that "Ten years ago, while working on The South Bank Show, Melvyn Bragg and I had a heated discussion on the pros and cons of film censorship. Broadly speaking, Melvyn was against it, while I, much to his surprise, was absolutely for it. He then dared me to write a script that I thought should be banned. I accepted the challenge and a month or so later sent him a short subject entitled A Kitten for Hitler. 'Ken,' he said, 'if ever you make this film and it is shown, you will be lynched.' " Russell joined the cast of the British reality television show Celebrity Big Brother in January 2007, at the start of the series, but left voluntarily within a week after an altercation with fellow housemate Jade Goody. At the age of 79, Russell was the then oldest person to be a contestant on the programme.

Russell and his wife Elize "Lisi" Tribble were invited by New York film writer Shade Rupe on a six-week journey across North America, beginning with a Lifetime Achievement Award given by Mitch Davis at the Fantasia International Film Festival on 20 July 2010, followed by a screening of The Devils. The next day, a near complete 35mm print retrospective of Russell's work at the Cinémathèque québécoise including Billion Dollar Brain, Women in Love, The Music Lovers, Crimes of Passion, The Rainbow, Whore and many more found projection along with an exhibition of several of Russell's photographs from the 1950s. The next stop was Russellmania! at the Lincoln Center, a nine-film overview of Russell's work from Women in Love through Valentino, with Russell present at each evening screening for a nearly sold-out weeklong festival. On 30 July 2010, for the opening night, Russell was joined by Vanessa Redgrave for a 40th anniversary screening of The Devils and the next evening saw The Music Lovers and Women in Love projected with Russell in attendance. Tommy Tune joined Russell the next evening for The Boy Friend and followed the screening with a live stage dance number from the film.

The American Cinematheque in Los Angeles next hosted Russell at the Aero Theatre in Santa Monica with screenings of The Devils and Altered States with Charles Haid and Stuart Baird in attendance, and Tommy and Lisztomania at the Egyptian the following evening. The tour wrapped up in Toronto at the Rue Morgue Festival of Fear and a packed screening of The Devils at the Bloor Cinema hosted by Richard Crouse.

In 2008, Russell made his New York directorial debut with the Off-Broadway production of Mindgame at the SoHo Playhouse produced by Monica Tidwell, a thriller by Anthony Horowitz and starring Keith Carradine, Lee Godart and Kathleen McNenny. Towards the end of his life, Russell was planning a remake of the 1976 erotic musical comedy Alice in Wonderland.

== Personal life ==
Russell converted to Roman Catholicism during the 1950s; he described The Devils (1971) as being the "last nail in the coffin of my Catholic faith". In a June 2010 interview at the Film Society of Lincoln Center, Russell stated: "I'm a devout Catholic; always have been, always will be."

Russell was married four times. His first marriage, to costume designer Shirley Kingdon from 1956 to 1978, produced four sons and a daughter. He was married to Vivian Jolly from 1984 to 1991 (the wedding celebrant being Anthony Perkins, who had been ordained in the Universal Life Church); the couple had a son and daughter. He was married to the actress and former ballerina Hetty Baynes from 1992 to 1997; the couple had a son. His first three marriages ended in divorce. He married American actress and artist Elize "Lisi" Tribble in 2001, and the marriage lasted until his death.

== Death ==
Russell died on 27 November 2011 at the age of 84, having suffered a series of strokes; he was survived by his wife and eight children. Before his death, he left his entire estate to his wife.

== Writings ==
Besides books on filmmaking and the British film industry, Russell also wrote A British Picture: An Autobiography (1989; published in the US as Altered States: The Autobiography of Ken Russell, 1991).

Russell also published six novels, including four on the sex lives of composers – Beethoven Confidential, Brahms Gets Laid, Elgar: The Erotic Variations, and Delius: A Moment with Venus.

Mike and Gaby's Space Gospel is a science-fiction rewriting of Genesis. Russell's last novel, also science fiction and published in 2006, is called Violation. It is a very violent future-shock tale of an England where football has become the national religion.

At the time of his death, Russell had a column for The Times in the Film section of times 2.

== Filmography ==
=== Feature films ===
Year	Title	Director	Writer	Producer	Notes
1964	French Dressing	Yes	No	No	
1967	Billion Dollar Brain	Yes	No	No	
1969	Women in Love	Yes	No	No	Nominated- Academy Award for Best Director; Nominated- Golden Globe Award for Best Director
1971	The Music Lovers	Yes	No	Yes	
1971	The Devils	Yes	Yes	Yes	Won- National Board of Review Award for Best Director; Won- Venice Film Festival for Pasinetti Award
1971	The Boy Friend	Yes	Yes	Yes	Won- National Board of Review Award for Best Director; Nominated- Writers Guild of America Award for Best Adapted Screenplay
1972	Savage Messiah	Yes	No	Yes	
1974	Mahler	Yes	Yes	No	
1975	Tommy	Yes	Yes	Yes	Nominated- Golden Globe Award for Best Motion Picture – Musical or Comedy
1975	Lisztomania	Yes	Yes	No	
1977	Valentino	Yes	Yes	No	
1980	Altered States	Yes	No	No	Nominated- Saturn Award for Best Director
1984	Crimes of Passion	Yes	No	No	
1986	Gothic	Yes	No	No	
1988	Salome's Last Dance	Yes	Yes	No	
1988	The Lair of the White Worm	Yes	Yes	Yes	
1989	The Rainbow	Yes	Yes	No	
1990	The Russia House	No	No	No	(As Walter)
1991	Whore	Yes	Yes	No	
1994	Mindbender	Yes	Yes	No	
2002	The Fall of the Louse of Usher	Yes	Yes	Yes	

=== Television films ===
- Prisoner of Honor (1991)
- The Secret Life of Arnold Bax (1992)
- Lady Chatterley (mini-series, 1993)
- Ken Russell's Treasure Island (1995)
- Dogboys (1998)

=== Short films ===
- Peep Show (1956)
- Amelia and the Angel (1958)
- Segment "Nessun Dorma" in Aria (1987)
- The Insatiable Mrs. Kirsch (1993)
- The Lion's Mouth (2000)
- Segment "The Girl with Golden Breasts" in Trapped Ashes (2006)
- A Kitten for Hitler (2007)

=== Documentaries ===
- John Betjeman: A Poet in London (1959)
- Gordon Jacob (1959)
- A House in Bayswater (1959)
- Pop Goes the Easel (1962)
- Elgar (1962)
- Watch the Birdie (1963)
- Bartok (1964)
- The Dotty World of James Lloyd (1964)
- The Debussy Film (1965)
- Always on Sunday (1965)
- Don't Shoot the Composer (1966)
- Isadora Duncan, the Biggest Dancer in the World (1966)
- Dante's Inferno (1967)
- Song of Summer (1968)
- Dance of the Seven Veils (1970)
- Clouds of Glory (1978)
- The Planets (1983)
- Vaughan Williams: A Symphonic Portrait (1984)
- Ken Russell's ABC of British Music (1988)
- The Strange Affliction of Anton Bruckner (1990)
- The Mystery of Dr Martinu (1992)
- Elgar: Fantasy on a Composer on a Bicycle (2002)

== Photography ==
Before achieving success in the film industry, Russell was a stills photographer for a period. An exhibition displaying some of Russell's work was on display during the summer of 2007 in central London's Proud Galleries in the Strand. The exhibition, entitled Ken Russell's Lost London Rediscovered: 1951–1957, included photos taken in and around London, with many of the pictures being taken in the Portobello Road area of London. An exhibition Ken Russell: Filmmaker, Photographer ran at several galleries in 2010.

== Music video ==
In the late-1980s, Russell directed the music video for "It's All Coming Back to Me Now", a song written and produced by Jim Steinman for his Pandora's Box project. The production featured a range of erotic imagery, including studded bras and spiked codpieces. He had also directed Elton John's video for "Nikita", which featured a scene of John wearing the same boots he wore as the Pinball Wizard in the film adaptation of the Who's Tommy.

== Cultural references ==
Light-hearted references to Russell often allude to sexual and religious (frequently Catholic) images in his work.

In his 1973 novel The Honorary Consul, English novelist Graham Greene includes a passage in which a "Conservative Member of Parliament had described the British entry [in the Mar del Plata Film Festival in Argentina] by some man named Russell as pornographic."

The band Godflesh used imagery from a hallucination sequence in Altered States for the cover of their first album Streetcleaner.

== See also ==
- Ken Russell's unrealised projects

== Bibliography ==
- Baxter, John (1973). An Appalling Talent: Ken Russell. Michael Joseph. ISBN 978-0-7181-1075-8.
- Gomez, Joseph A. (1976). Ken Russell: The Adaptor as Creator. Muller. ISBN 0-584-10203-8.
- Phillips, Gene D. (1979). Ken Russell. Twayne. ISBN 978-0-8057-9266-9.
- Lanza, Joseph (2008). Phallic Frenzy: Ken Russell and His Films. Aurum Press. ISBN 978-1-84513-373-3.
- Flanagan, Kevin M., ed. (2009). Ken Russell: Re-Viewing England's Last Mannerist. Scarecrow Press. ISBN 978-0-8108-6954-7.
- Sutton, Paul (2012). Becoming Ken Russell. Bear Claw Press. ISBN 978-0-9572462-3-2.
- Sutton, Paul (2015). Talking About Ken Russell. Buffalo Books. ISBN 978-0-9931770-2-6.
