= Elgar (film) =

- Genre: Drama documentary
- Written by: Ken Russell; Huw Wheldon
- Directed by: Ken Russell
- Starring: George McGrath; Peter Brett; Rowena Gregory
- Country of origin: United Kingdom
- Original language: English

Production
- Producer: Humphrey Burton
- Camera setup: Ken Higgins
- Running time: 56 minutes

Original release
- Network: BBC
- Release: 11 November 1962

Elgar is a British drama documentary made in 1962 by the British director Ken Russell for BBC Television's Monitor series. It dramatised in vigorous style the life of the English composer Sir Edward Elgar.

The film established Russell as a directorial talent, and spawned a series of dramatised biographies of composers by Russell, both for television and theatrical release. Elgar helped to revive the reputation of the composer's work.

In the words of one writer, the film "marks the debut of both a great and original visual stylist (Russell) and the first use of techniques that have since become almost commonplace in the realm of documentary filmmaking."

The film was narrated by Huw Wheldon. The British Film Institute selected it as one of the 100 Greatest British Television Programmes.

== Cast ==
- George McGrath (Sir Edward Elgar)
- Peter Brett (Mr Elgar)
- Rowena Gregory (Mrs Elgar)
- Louisa Nicholas (Elgar's daughter)

== Reception ==
The acclaim led to Russell being offered his first feature French Dressing. It also prompted a revival in interest in Elgar's work, leading to albums being released.

By 1966, it was being called "a classic of television which time will not touch."

In 1995, a contributor to The Globe and Mail wrote:

What is singularly striking about Elgar is how beautifully photographed and composed it is. Though shot in black and white, the use of light and the brilliant blending of images and glorious music makes most of what we are used to seeing on the tube and (movie screen) seem flat and unimaginative. Russell's training and previous work as a photographer is shown to great advantage in this exquisite film. He also pioneers the use of actors, without dialogue and with minimal narration, to create a "new" form, a cinematic hybrid utilizing the most powerful aspects of several artistic forms: film, music, biography, television and photography.

Reviewing the production in 2011, The New Yorker commented: "most of it is glorious, with reënactment scenes that might easily have tipped into Monty Python territory redeemed by their intimate connection to the musical excerpts on the soundtrack. This is because Russell, like no other filmmaker, has an essential insight into what goes into a composer’s life, strung between play and work, dreaming and drudgery."
