= French Dressing (1964 film) =

1964 film by Ken Russell

- Theatrical release poster
- Directed by: Ken Russell
- Screenplay by: Peter Myers; Ronald Cass; Peter Brett
- Additional dialogue by: Johnny Speight
- Story by: Peter Myers; Ronald Cass
- Produced by: Kenneth Harper
- Starring: James Booth; Marisa Mell; Roy Kinnear; Alita Naughton
- Cinematography: Kenneth Higgins
- Edited by: Jack Slade
- Music by: Georges Delerue
- Production company: Kenwood
- Distributed by: Warner-Pathé Distributors
- Release date: 10 April 1964 (UK)
- Running time: 86 minutes
- Country: United Kingdom
- Language: English
- Budget: £179,467

French Dressing is a 1964 British comedy film directed by Ken Russell (in his feature directorial debut) and starring James Booth, Marisa Mell and Roy Kinnear. It was written by Peter Myers, Ronald Cass, and Peter Brett, with contributions by Johnny Speight.

The plot concerns a deckchair attendant in the run-down seaside resort of Gormleigh-on-Sea who is promoted to publicity officer. In an effort to drum up interest in the town, he organises a film festival and invites a major French film star. The event is soon thrown into chaos by the machinations of jealous mayors from rival towns.

Russell later called it "a very unhappy film as far as I was concerned".

== Plot ==
Jim Stephens is a deckchair attendant working in the flagging seaside resort town of Gormleigh in a job secured for him by his friend, the entertainments manager Henry Liggott. Jim enjoys his easy life in the town with his girlfriend, Judy, a young reporter on the local paper. Things are soon turned upside down when Judy writes an article at Jim's suggestion calling for a film festival featuring Brigitte Bardot to revitalise the town and bring in tourists.

The three of them are summoned to see the mayor to explain Jim's conduct the following morning. When Jim admits he can't get Bardot the mayor threatens him with dismissal. This leads Jim to suggest that instead of getting Bardot, they try to secure the French film star Françoise Fayol, whose latest New Wave film Pavements of Boulogne is premiering in Boulogne. With the mayor's approval, Stephens and Liggott travel across the Channel on the Medway Queen to persuade her to attend the planned film festival.

Once in France they find Fayol by accident when she drives into a group of inflatable dolls on the beach. They burn the dolls. They then find that Fayol is frustrated by being typecast as a sex symbol rather than being given more intellectual roles and wishes to break free from her domineering mentor. The two Englishman are able to win her friendship by helping to destroy a large consignment of inflatable replica models of her which she hates. She accompanies them back to Britain, where the people of Gormleigh organise a pageant based on the links between England and France to welcome her. The floats depict: King Harold getting an arrow in the eye at the Battle of Hastings; Madame Guillotine; and French art. The Napoleon and Josephine float gets jammed and the VIP grandstand accidentally gets launched down a slipway.

Fayol's introduction to life in Gormleigh is not a happy one, and includes being soaked first in the sea, then by rain and then in a puddle. She refuses to leave her hotel room and has to be coaxed out by Jim, for whom she has developed a liking. Jim and Fayol's publicity campaign sets about shaking up the staid town and its old-fashioned inhabitants. As Jim grows closer to Françoise Fayol, Judy becomes increasingly upset.

When the film festival opens, it turns out to be a roaring success as tourists and the media flock in, attracted almost entirely by Fayol's presence and the glamour that comes in her wake. The finale of the festival features the screening of Fayol's new film Pavements of Boulogne, followed the next morning by the opening of a new nudist beach. Fayol is extremely nervous about her new film, as she hates seeing herself on screen, and is eager to win the main prize at the festival – the golden cockle. Things at first seem to be going well at the screening until the show is suddenly disrupted by a violent brawl organised by the jealous mayors of rival towns.

The next morning Fayol, distraught by the fight and the savage reviews of her film by newspapers, including Judy's, decides to go back to the Continent where her domineering mentor has found her a brilliant new film to star in. Despite a desperate rush to the railway station by Liggott to prevent her, she catches the train leaving the heroes urgently needing to find someone to take her place at the opening of the town's first nudist beach. Judy puts on a blonde wig and sunglasses and pretends to be Fayol.

== Cast ==
- James Booth as Jim Stephens
- Roy Kinnear as Henry Liggott
- Marisa Mell as Françoise Fayol
- Alita Naughton as Judy
- Bryan Pringle as The Mayor of Gormleigh
- Sandor Elès as Vladek
- Robert Robinson as himself (presenting the Film Festival)
- Norman Pitt as Mayor of Westbourne
- Henry McCarthy as Mayor of Bridgemouth
- Germaine Delbat as French woman

Uncredited

- Claire Gordon as Angelina
- Lucille Soong as French starlet

== Production ==
=== Development ===
In the early 1960s. Ken Russell established a strong reputation in television, particularly with Elgar (1962). Producer Kenneth Harper later said he "was tremendously impressed with his [Russell's] work on television and thought he would make a first class director." Harper offered him the job of directing the Cliff Richard musical Summer Holiday (1963), but Russell turned it down. The film wound up being directed by Peter Yates and became successful (Russell said Yates "did a very good job, considering the material – better than I could have done, I'm sure.").

Harper then asked Russell to direct French Dressing and promised it would not be a musical. Harper said he wanted Russell to make a Jacques Tati style comedy set at a "seedy English seaside resort." Russell was keen to move out of the BBC and said the treatment (by Summer Holiday writers Cass and Myers) "was promising" and agreed to direct. Associated British agreed to finance a script by Cass and Myers. Russell later said, "One of Ken's great weaknesses is that he's very loyal to his friends, irrespective of their talent."

Harper wanted to shoot the film in Herne Bay, best known at the time for having the second longest pier in the country. Russell called it "a miserable resort on the Thames Estuary."

He went there with the writers "to soak up the atmosphere and inspiration" but Russell found the resulting script "uninspired". He later called it "a script of such monumental unfunniness as to make the Crucifixion seem like a Mack Sennett farce. It was in the style of the old Ealing comedies... but even more forced and artificial."

Russell requested work be done on it by an actor friend of his, Peter Brett, who had been in Elgar. This was done but Russell says "the script remained uninspired. We shot it all the same. I learned a lot." He later said the final script "had not one funny line in it and hardly any comic scenes, because he wasn't a very jokey writer and most of my scenes were forlorn rather than funny."

=== Casting ===
The lead role was originally cast with Annette Stroyberg, with her husband Roger Vadim set to play Vladek. Two days before the start principal photography, Stroyberg fell ill, and both dropped out. Harper hastily searched for a new actress, and a week into filming replaced her with Marisa Mell, who spoke little English at the time. Mell (a natural brunette) refused to dye her hair blonde, leading to a joke in the film about her character wearing a wig.

Alita Naughton had worked with Russell in television. He recalled meeting her through her then boy friend and later husband, the photographer David Hurn.

=== Shooting ===
Filming started in May 1963. The film was shot at Elstree Studios, near London and on location at Herne Bay.

Russell later wrote in his memoirs: "The film industry was not ready to accept TV directors. Everything was done by the book, improvisation was frowned upon and there was little team spirit."

It was Russell's first experience working with actors and he was unsure how to do it. "Until then I'd used actors as props, moving them about the landscape like cattle or as set dressing, sitting at tables like tailor's dummies in attitudes of inspiration – hand to head and pen to paper. And as yet they had not been allowed to utter a word." Russell said he was overwhelmed by the concept of actors talking to each other on film "I used to watch in open mouthed wonder and admiration every time it happened."

Ken Harper pulled Russell aside and told him the actors were unhappy he was not talking to them. He told the director "this is supposed to be a comedy. We're not getting many laughs." Russell said defensively "every time Roy Kinnear falls flat on his face the crew kills themselves." Harper said this was "a sure sign we've got a dead duck on our hands."

Harper told Russell that "a film director has to be a psychiatrist" and the director changed accordingly, "but it was too late as far as French Dressing was concerned. The film was a flop."

Russell said the film "featured the opening of a nudist beach, which only escaped the censors as it took place in a torrential rainstorm in extreme longshot."

Harper said he and Russell "had a blazing row" when the film was done "but that was just to clear the air. I told him to get gimmicks out of his system and concentrate more on the characters. After all it's the people who matter and what happens to them and I said you've got to have heart for want of a better cliche. He took it very well."

Russell said Harper showed the film to Tati "who liked the first five minutes and hated the rest."

== Reception ==
=== Box office ===
The film was a box office failure. Russell later said he felt the film "sadly turned out to be a little too Gallic in flavour for English tastes."

"No one offered me a second chance", wrote Russell. "The big screen, the big time, had been an illusion. Suitably chastened, I returned, like the prodigal nephew, to Auntie BBC."

Harper said in a 1964 interview that "the film industry is likely to cold shoulder" Russell due to the failure of the film "and he'll be lucky if he's ever given another film to direct...[but] I'm still convinced that within three films he'll come up with a winner." Russell's third feature, Women in Love (1969), would be a huge commercial and critical success.

=== Critical response ===
The Monthly Film Bulletin wrote: "Ken Russell's TV documentaries have been highly praised, but his first full-length film is notable more for spirited endeavour than for any real accomplishment. The direction has a sub-Richardson flavour about it, and the film, aiming at a blend of wit and lyricism, achieves only an undisciplined mixture of buffoonery, fantasy and sentimentality. Despite the efforts to attain a suitably free-wheeling exuberance of style, the film lacks rhythm and flow; everything goes on too long. ... French dressing maybe, but underneath, the familiar, indigestible British stodge."

Richard Roud of The Guardian said "the result is disastrous". Kingsley Amis in The Observer said it had "some genuine high spirits". The New Statesman described it as a "seaside rainswept comedy of peculiar charm and freshness."

Reflecting on the film in his 1994 memoir, The Lion Roars, Russell said: "Like oil and vinegar, the ingredients didn't mix. A script by a couple of West End review writers didn't jell with the images concocted by an arty director from TV making his first feature." He added that Booth and Kinnear were "saddled with lousy dialogue and a director who seems more concerned with composition than content. There are a few visual gags, mostly at the expense of the mayor and corporation, but there's only so much comedy you can wring out of extras in top hats and tails making fools of themselves on a beach with buckets and spades and Hula-Hoops.

Russell admitted at one stage he compared the film with Monsieur Hulot's Holiday (1953). "What arrogance! Dream on, Mr Director, dream on. The only truly French touch in your flop of a film came from the pen of Georges Delerue. Undoubtedly, the scintillating score – Georges' first ever outside his native France – was the best thing in the movie."

== Reputation ==
According to Halliwell's Film & Video Guide, Russell's film is paced at "breakneck speed with echoes of Tati, Keaton and the Keystone Cops. Alas lack of star comedians and firm control make its exuberance merely irritating". Oliver Berry writes that, while it "aims to satirise the St Tropez-French Riviera scene by relocating it to Gormleigh-on-Sea", the outcome is "more reminiscent of Benny Hill than Buster Keaton".

In 2008, Russell returned for a screening of the film at Herne Bay. He said: "Nothing about Herne Bay seems to have changed that much. Obviously half the pier has sunk, but that's about it. The vibes are still the same and the town has the same charm it had in 1963. The smell is still the same as well – a bit fishy."

== Bibliography ==
- Baxter, John (1973). An Appalling Talent: Ken Russell. London: Joseph. ISBN 978-0-7181-1075-8.
- Russell, Ken (1991). Altered States. New York: Bantam Books. ISBN 978-0-5530-7831-2.
