= Monitor (British TV programme) =

BBC arts programme (1958-1965)

- Country of origin: United Kingdom

Original release
- Network: BBC
- Release: 2 February 1958 – 1965

Monitor is a British arts television programme that was launched on 2 February 1958 on BBC and ran until 1965.

== History ==
Huw Wheldon was the editor from 1958 to 1962. He was also the principal interviewer and anchor until 1964. Wheldon set about moulding a team of talents, including W. G. Archer, Melvyn Bragg, Humphrey Burton, John Berger, Patrick Garland, Peter Newington, Ken Russell, John Schlesinger, Nancy Thomas, and Alan Tyrer. Monitor ranged in subject over all the arts.

The role as editor of the series was passed to Humphrey Burton in July 1962, lasting a year. He was succeeded by David Jones who had worked on the series since the beginning.

The hundredth programme, made in 1962, was a film directed by Ken Russell and written by Wheldon, the celebrated Elgar. The Elgar film was innovative because it was the first time that an arts programme showed one long film about an artistic figure instead of short items, and it was the first time that re-enactments were used. Before this, only photos or location shots had been used in programmes. Russell, however, still met resistance from Wheldon in allowing actors to play the subjects of his films. The Elgar film includes sequences of the young composer riding his bicycle on the Malvern Hills accompanied by Elgar's Introduction & Allegro for Strings. Russell had a particular empathy with Elgar's music because, like the composer, he was a Catholic.

Wheldon's Monitor lasted until he had "interviewed everyone [he was] interested in interviewing", and he was succeeded by Jonathan Miller for the series' last season in 1964/65. Miller was both presenter and editor.

The theme tune was "Marcia" from Serenade for String Orchestra (Op. 11, 1937) by Dag Wirén. The book Monitor: An Anthology, edited by Huw Wheldon, was published by Macdonald in 1962.
