= HaMerotz LaMillion 3 =

Season of television series

- Season 3
- Presented by: Ron Shahar
- No. of teams: 11
- Winners: Talia Gorodess & Koby Windzberg
- No. of legs: 13
- Distance traveled: 37,000 km (23,000 mi)
- No. of episodes: 30 (34 including recaps)

Release
- Original network: Channel 2
- Original release: 11 May – 31 August 2013

Additional information
- Filming dates: 15 January – 2 February 2013; 30–31 July 2013

Series chronology
- ← Previous; Season 2 Next → Season 4

HaMerotz LaMillion 3 is the third season of HaMerotz LaMillion (Hebrew: המירוץ למיליון, lit. The Race to the Million), an Israeli reality competition show based on the American series The Amazing Race. Hosted by Ron Shahar, it featured eleven teams of two, each with a pre-existing relationship, in a race around the world to win ₪1,000,000. This season visited four continents and seven countries and traveled over 37,000 kilometres (23,000 mi) during thirteen legs. Starting in Haifa, racers traveled through Israel, Spain, France, Brazil, Cuba, the United States, and Taiwan before finishing in Taipei. New twists introduced in this season include the Double U-Turn, with the recipients of a U-Turn Vote allowed to use the U-Turn on another team; the Intersection; the no-rest leg; and the Salvage Pass, which was awarded to the winners of the second leg and gave them a choice between a head start in the next leg or saving the last team from elimination. The season premiered on 11 May 2013 on Channel 2 and the finale aired on 31 August 2013.

Newlyweds Talia Gorodess and Koby Windzberg were the winners of this season, while sisters Romi and Coral Gemer finished in second place and cousins Ma'ayan Refaeli and Bat-El Musai finished in third place.

== Production ==
=== Development and filming ===
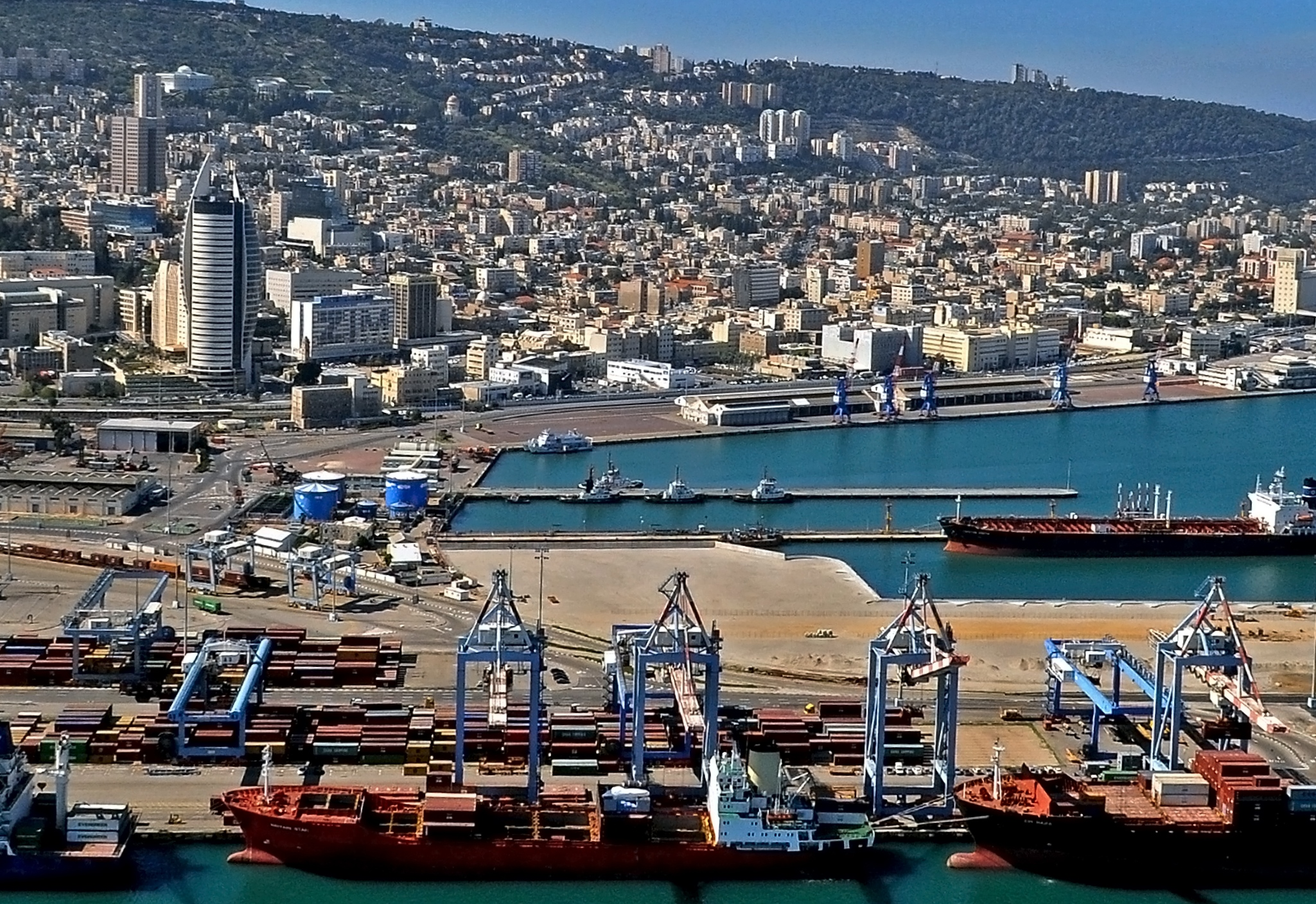
Teams began the third season of HaMerotz LaMillion at the Port of Haifa.

The bulk of filming for this season took place in January 2013. On 24 January 2013, the show was in Rio de Janeiro, Brazil. By 31 January 2013, teams had traveled to Las Vegas in the United States. The racecourse for this season included four continents and seven countries. At the start of the competition, two legs were run in Israel with the possibility of one team being eliminated in each leg. This season also incorporated two new twists with the Salvage Pass and the Double U-Turn. The Salvage Pass, which was previously seen in The Amazing Race Australia 2 and The Amazing Race Philippines 1, was awarded to the team that came in first on the second leg and gave that team the opportunity to save the team that came in last or receive a time advantage at the beginning of the third leg.

Two U-Turns this season were designated as Double U-Turns, in which the team that received the most votes for a U-Turn were given the opportunity to U-Turn another team. Leg 11 marks the first time in the franchise two Detours and a U-Turn were placed at the same leg; however, the U-Turn only applied for the first Detour.

=== Casting ===
In August 2012, Reshet began casting for a third season of HaMerotz LaMillion, with final applications due on 31 December 2012.

== Cast ==
The cast for this season included married grandparents from New York and South Africa, friends from the Ezra youth movement, Port of Ashdod dock workers, and cousins of Persian descent. Coral previously dated Tom Kashty from the second season.

After they were eliminated on Leg 6, Shimi Edri proposed to Yasmin Nagorni, who accepted. The two were married on 3 October 2013, in a ceremony attended by Debbie & Dana, Eliran & Itzik, Ma'ayan & Bat-El, Romi & Coral, and Talia & Koby.

| Contestants | Age | Relationship | Hometown | Status |
|---|---|---|---|---|
| Herut Vaysenstern (חרות) | 21 | Religious Teenagers | Petah Tikva | Eliminated 1st (in Caesarea, Israel) |
| Yael "Yoftut" Teitelbaum (יופטוט) | 20 | Religious Teenagers | Petah Tikva | Eliminated 1st (in Caesarea, Israel) |
| Andrea Zaltzmann (אנדריאה) | 57 | Grandparents to 19 Children | Jerusalem | Withdrew (in Madrid, Spain) |
| Ronnie Zaltzmann (רוני) | 60 | Grandparents to 19 Children | Jerusalem | Withdrew (in Madrid, Spain) |
| Ronit Shavit (רונית) | 33 | Purchasing Manager & Lawyer | Afula | Eliminated 2nd (in Seville, Spain) |
| Liran Cohen (לירן) | 27 | Purchasing Manager & Lawyer | Afula | Eliminated 2nd (in Seville, Spain) |
| Shimi Edri (שימי) | 26 | Spouses | Tel Aviv | Eliminated 3rd (in Rio de Janeiro, Brazil) |
| Yasmin Nagorni (יסמין) | 19 | Spouses | Tel Aviv | Eliminated 3rd (in Rio de Janeiro, Brazil) |
| Mor Cohen (מור) | 28 | Married with 2 Children | Eilat | Eliminated 4th (in Ciénaga de Zapata, Cuba) |
| Lior Cohen (ליאור) | 33 | Married with 2 Children | Eilat | Eliminated 4th (in Ciénaga de Zapata, Cuba) |
| Eliran Elenbogen (אלירן) | 26 | Falafel Seller & Beach Cleaner | Carmiel | Eliminated 5th (in Clark County, United States) |
| Itzik Madhani (איציק) | 28 | Falafel Seller & Beach Cleaner | Carmiel | Eliminated 5th (in Clark County, United States) |
| Debbie Baruch (דבי) | 46 | Real Estate Developer & Daughter | Jerusalem | Eliminated 6th (in Black Canyon City, United States) |
| Dana Dahan (דנה) | 24 | Real Estate Developer & Daughter | Jerusalem | Eliminated 6th (in Black Canyon City, United States) |
| David Guedj (דויד) | 28 | Dock Workers | Ashdod | Eliminated 7th (in Taipei, Taiwan) |
| Eliran Look (אלירן) | 28 | Dock Workers | Ashdod | Eliminated 7th (in Taipei, Taiwan) |
| Ma'ayan Refaeli (מעיין) | 20 | Cousins on Both Sides | Zrahia | Third Place |
| Bat-El Musai (בת-אל) | 20 | Cousins on Both Sides | Zrahia | Third Place |
| Romi Gemer (רומי) | 18 | Sisters | Petah Tikva | Second Place |
| Coral Gemer (קורל) | 20 | Sisters | Petah Tikva | Second Place |
| Talia Gorodess (טליה) | 30 | Newlyweds | Giv'atayim | Winners |
| Koby Windzberg (קובי) | 34 | Newlyweds | Giv'atayim | Winners |

== Results ==
The following teams participated in the season, with their relationships at the time of filming. Note that this table is not necessarily reflective of all content broadcast on television due to inclusion or exclusion of some data. Placements are listed in finishing order:

| Team | Position (by leg) | | | | | | | | | | | | | Roadblocks performed |
| Team | 1 | 2+ | 3+ | 4 | 5+ | 6 | 7+ | 8+ | 9+ | 10 | 11+^{3} | 12 | 13 | Roadblocks performed |
|---|---|---|---|---|---|---|---|---|---|---|---|---|---|---|
| Talia & Koby | 5th | 6th | 8th− | 8th⊃ | 4th> | 4th⊃ | 1st⊃ | 1st⊃ | 2nd>^ | 5th | 2nd^{⊃}_{⋐} | 1st | 1st | Talia 4, Koby 3 |
| Romi & Coral | 3rd | 3rd | 4th⊃ | 1st | 3rd | 3rd | 7th⊃− | 4th⊃ | 4th»° | 3rd | 1st− | 3rd | 2nd | Romi 4, Coral 3 |
| Ma'ayan & Bat-El | 9th | 9th | 5th⊂ | 4th⊃ | 5th> | 5th⊂ | 5th | 3rd | 1st>° | 1st | 4th⊃ | 2nd | 3rd | Ma'ayan 4, Bat-El 3 |
| David & Eliran | 4th | 5th | 7th | 3rd⊃ | 1st> | 2nd | 2nd | 2nd | 3rd^{«}_{>}^ | 2nd | 3rd⊃ | 4th | | David 3, Eliran 4 |
| Debbie & Dana | 10th | 4th | 1st⊃ | 6th^{⊂}_{⋑} | 6th< | 6th⊃ | 3rd⊃ | 5th⊃− | 6th^{<}_{»}~ | 4th | 5th^{⊂}_{⋑} | | | Debbie 4, Dana 3 |
| Eliran & Itzik | 6th | 8th | 2nd⊃ | 5th | 8th− | 1stƒ⊃ | 6th⊃ | 6th⊃ | 5th»~− | 6th | | | | Eliran 3, Itzik 3 |
| Mor & Lior | 1st | 2nd | 6th | 2nd^{⊃}_{⋐} | 2nd> | 7th | 4th⊂ | 7th⊂ | | | | | | Mor 3, Lior 1 |
| Shimi & Yasmin | 8th | 7th | 9th⊃ | 7th | 7th | 8th⊃ | | | | | | | | Shimi 2, Yasmin 2 |
| Ronit & Liran | 2nd | 1st | 3rd | 9th⊃ | | | | | | | | | | Ronit 1, Liran 1 |
| Andrea & Ronnie | 7th | 10th−^{1} | 10th⊃^{2} | | | | | | | | | | | Andrea 0, Ronnie 1 |
| Herut & Yoftut | 11th | | | | | | | | | | | | | Herut 0, Yoftut 0 |

Key

- A red team placement means the team was eliminated.
- A green ƒ indicates that the team won a Fast Forward.
- An underlined leg number indicates that there was no mandatory rest period at the Pit Stop and all teams were ordered to continue racing. An underlined team placement indicates that the team came in last, was ordered to continue racing, and didn't receive a penalty or punishment in the next leg.
- A blue team placement indicates that the team came in last but was not eliminated.
  - An italicized blue placement indicates that the team came in last on an elimination leg but was saved by the team with the Salvage Pass.
  - An underlined blue team's placement indicates that the team came in last on a non-elimination leg and was required to wear their winter clothing for the duration of the next leg, which took place in Brazil.
  - A bold blue team's placement indicates that the team came in last on a non-elimination leg and would have to wait an extra 30 minutes before departing on the next leg.
- An orange + indicates that there was a Duel on this leg, while an orange − indicates the team that lost the Duel and received a 15-minute penalty.
- A brown ⊂ indicates the team who received a U-Turn; ⊃ indicates that the team voted for the recipient; A cyan ⋑ indicates that the team was granted an exclusive U-Turn in a Double U-Turn; ⋐ indicates the team who received it.
- A yellow < or orange « indicates the team who received a Yield; > or orange » indicates that the team voted for the recipient.
- Matching colored symbols (teal ^, magenta °, and olive ~) indicate teams who worked together during part of the leg as a result of an Intersection.

Notes

1. Andrea & Ronnie arrived at the Pit Stop in last place; however, Ronit & Liran used their Salvage Pass to save Andrea & Ronnie from elimination.
2. During the overnight rest, Andrea & Ronnie elected to withdraw from the competition after Ronnie suffered a leg injury that sustained during the Roadblock. Instead of completing the leg, Andrea & Ronnie were sent to the Pit Stop after the other teams had checked-in for their elimination.
3. The Double U-Turn appeared after the first of two Detours and targeted teams were only required to perform both tasks of that Detour.

=== Voting history ===
Teams may vote to choose either U-Turn or Yield. The team with the most votes received the U-Turn or Yield penalty, depending on the respective leg. In Leg 4 and 11 which contain Double U-Turn, all teams voted on the first U-Turn, but the team who was U-Turned was given the opportunity to use the second U-Turn for their own.

| | U-Turn | Double U-Turn | | Yield | U-Turn | | | Yield | Double U-Turn | |
|---|---|---|---|---|---|---|---|---|---|---|
| Leg | 3 | 4 | | 5 | 6 | 7 | 8 | 9 | 11 | |
| U-Turned/Yielded | Ma'ayan & Bat-El | Debbie & Dana | Mor & Lior | Debbie & Dana | Ma'ayan & Bat-El | Mor & Lior | Mor & Lior | David & Eliran; Debbie & Dana | Debbie & Dana | Talia & Koby |
| Result | 5–3–2 | 5–4 | 1–0 | 4–3–1 | 4–3–1 | 4–3 | 4–3 | 3–3 | 3–2 | 1–0 |
| Voter | Team's Vote | | | | | | | | | |
| Talia & Koby | Debbie & Dana | Debbie & Dana | None | Debbie & Dana | Ma'ayan & Bat-El | Mor & Lior | Mor & Lior | Debbie & Dana | Debbie & Dana | None |
| Romi & Coral | Ma'ayan & Bat-El | Ma'ayan & Bat-El | None | David & Eliran | Talia & Koby | Mor & Lior | Mor & Lior | David & Eliran | David & Eliran | None |
| Ma'ayan & Bat-El | Mor & Lior | Debbie & Dana | None | Debbie & Dana | Debbie & Dana | Debbie & Dana | Debbie & Dana | Debbie & Dana | Debbie & Dana | None |
| David & Eliran | Debbie & Dana | Debbie & Dana | None | Debbie & Dana | Debbie & Dana | Debbie & Dana | Debbie & Dana | Debbie & Dana | Debbie & Dana | None |
| Debbie & Dana | Ma'ayan & Bat-El | Ma'ayan & Bat-El | Mor & Lior | Ma'ayan & Bat-El | Ma'ayan & Bat-El | Mor & Lior | Mor & Lior | David & Eliran | David & Eliran | Talia & Koby |
| Itzik & Eliran | Ma'ayan & Bat-El | Ma'ayan & Bat-El | None | Ma'ayan & Bat-El | Ma'ayan & Bat-El | Mor & Lior | Mor & Lior | David & Eliran | | |
| Mor & Lior | Debbie & Dana | Debbie & Dana | None | Debbie & Dana | Debbie & Dana | Debbie & Dana | Debbie & Dana | | | |
| Shimi & Yasmin | Ma'ayan & Bat-El | Ma'ayan & Bat-El | None | Ma'ayan & Bat-El | Ma'ayan & Bat-El | | | | | |
| Ronit & Liran | Mor & Lior | Debbie & Dana | None | | | | | | | |
| Andrea & Ronnie | Ma'ayan & Bat-El | | | | | | | | | |

== Episode Titles ==
Translated from Hebrew from the official website:

1. The Starting Line Event! (!אירוע ההזנקה) (Leg 1)
2. Who Will Board on the Plane? (?מי יעלה למטוס) (Leg 2)
3. Landing in Spain (נוחתים בספרד) (Leg 3)
4. Something Surreal! (!סוריאליסטי משהו) (Leg 3)
5. Squeezing the Juice! (!סוחטים את המיץ) (Leg 3)
6. Pleasant Scrub! (!קרצוף נעים) (Leg 4)
7. The Great Bed Race (!מירוץ המיטות הגדול) (Leg 4)
8. Leaving Spain (נפרדים מספרד) (Leg 4)
9. Landing in Paris! (!נוחתים בפריז) (Legs 4 & 5)
10. Fabulous Paris! (!פריז רותחת) (Leg 5)
11. Which Team Will Break? (?מי מהזוגות יישבר) (Leg 5)
12. Landing in Brazil! (!נוחתים בברזיל) (Leg 6)
13. City of God (עיר האלוהים) (Leg 6)
14. Leaving Brazil! (!נפרדים מברזיל) (Leg 6)
15. On the Way to Cuba (בדרך לקובה) (Recap)
16. Landing to the Salsa Rhythm of Cuba! (!נוחתים בקובה לקצב הסלסה) (Leg 7)
17. Cuban-Style Celebration (חגיגה נוסח קובה) (Leg 7)
18. For Whom Will the Race End? (?בשביל מי המירוץ יסתיים) (Leg 7)
19. Crocodile Tears (דמעות תנין) (Leg 8)
20. Pirates of the Caribbean (שודדי הקאריביים) (Leg 8)
21. Landing in Vegas! (!נוחתים בווגאס) (Leg 9)
22. Who Will Have More Luck? (?למי יהיה יותר מזל) (Leg 9)
23. Vegas at Large! (!ואגס בענק) (Leg 9)
24. To Infinity and Beyond ("אל האינסוף ומעבר לו) (Legs 9 & 10)
25. Horror Film (סרט אימה) (Leg 10)
26. Leaving One of the Teams! (!נפרדים מאחד הזוגות) (Leg 10)
27. The Secrets and Longings Overflow (הסודות והגעגועים מציפים) (Recap)
28. Running in the Snow (רצים בשלג) (Leg 11)
29. Indian Dance (ריקוד אינדיאני) (Leg 11)
30. Travel Diary of the Teams (יומן המסע של הזוגות) (Behind the Scenes at the Pit Stop)
31. Fateful Quarterfinals (רבע הגמר הגורלי) (Leg 11)
32. Final Elimination Before the Finals (ההדחה האחרונה לפני הגמר) (Leg 12)
33. Grand Finale! (!הגמר הגדול) (Leg 13)
34. Speaking from the Heart! (!מדברים מהלב) (Recap)

== Race summary ==
Route Map of the Race.

| Destinations | Air travel Rail travel Water travel Bus travel Helicopter travel Bicycle travel Gondola travel |
| Route Markers | צומת (Detour) מחסום (Roadblock) קיצור דרך (Fast Forward) מסלול משותף (Intersection) עצור (Yield) סיבוב פרסה (U-Turn) דו–קרב (Duel) נקודת סיום (Pit Stop) |

=== Leg 1 (Israel) ===
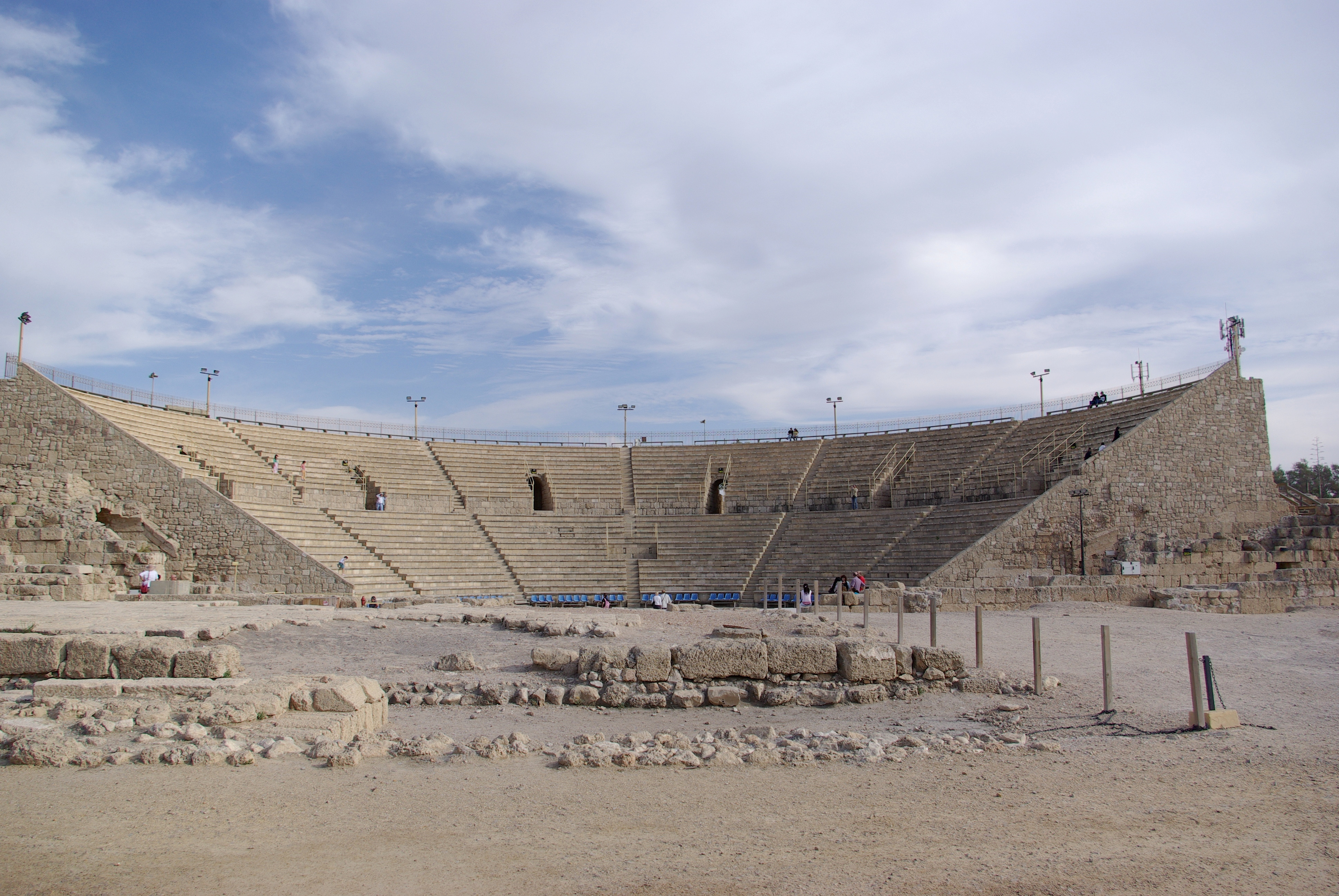
The first leg of HaMerotz LaMillion 3 concluded at the Roman amphitheatre of Caesarea Maritima.

- Episode 1 (11 May 2013)
- Prize: A gift card (awarded to Mor & Lior)
- Eliminated: Herut & Yoftut

Locations

- Haifa, Israel (Port of Haifa) (Starting Line)
- Haifa District (Ein Shemer)
- Caesarea (Caesarea Maritima)

Episode summary

- Teams began at the Port of Haifa and had to navigate to the top of a shipping container stack, which included climbing a rope ladder and crossing a gap. Teams were provided with ladders, hooks, a yoga ball, and a key, which, unbeknownst to them, unlocked a door halfway up with an extra ladder, and could take as much as they could carry. After retrieving their next clue, teams were instructed to drive to the kibbutz of Ein Shemer.
- This season's first Detour was a choice between Eliezer and the Carrot (אליעזר והגזר – Aley'ezer Vahegzer) or Babar Azar (המפוזר מכפר אז״ר – Hamfuzer Mekhfer Azar). In Eliezer and the Carrot, teams had to convince 20 passersby to donate their clothes, tie them into a rope, and pull a giant carrot out of the ground before receiving their next clue. In Babar Azar, teams had to deliver 12 sacks across a field, with one team member on the ground mimicking a train, before receiving their next clue.
- After the Detour, teams had to check in at the Pit Stop: Caesarea Maritima in Caesarea.

=== Leg 2 (Israel) ===
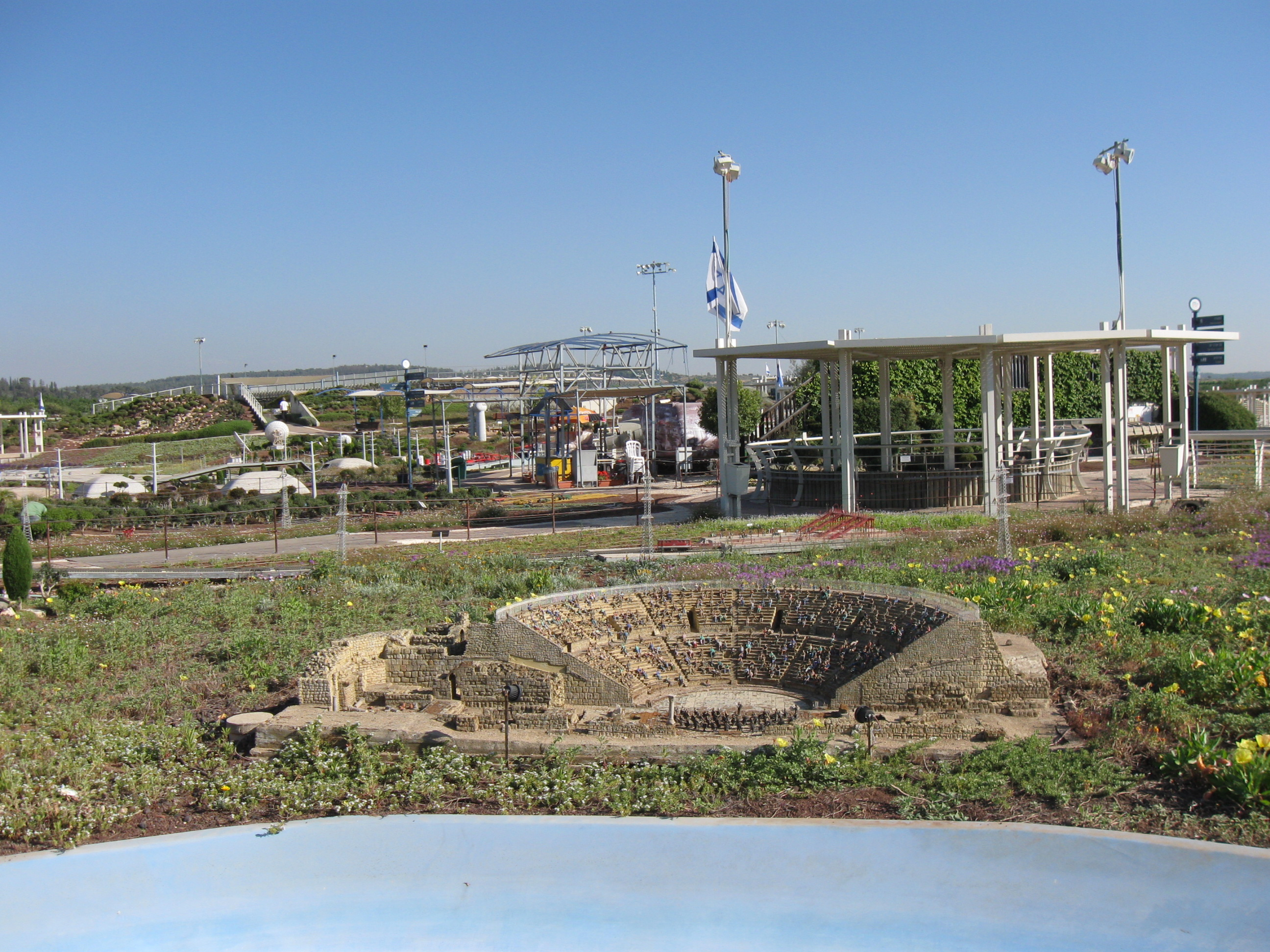
Teams ended the second leg in Israel at Mini Israel.

- Episode 2 (15 May 2013)
- Prize: The Salvage Pass (כרטיס הצלה), which allows the holders to save the last place team from elimination or allows them to depart early on the next leg, and a pampering treatment (awarded to Ronit & Liran)

Locations

- Caesarea (Caesarea Maritima)
- Central District (Yakum)
- Tel Aviv (Herods Hotel)
- Green Line (Mini Israel)

Episode summary

- At the start of this leg, teams were instructed to drive to Yakum and find their next clue.
- For this season's first Duel, one member from each team was held in the air and had to hug their partner. The first person to drop their partner would lose and had to wait for another teams, while the other team could continue racing. The team that lost the final Duel had to wait out a 15-minute penalty.
- After the Duel, teams found a flyer on their cars written in archaic Hebrew directing them to drive to the Herods Hotel in Ahuzat Bayit (Tel Aviv). Once there, teams had to pay 100 Qirsh before gaining entry (one new shekel).
- In the hotel, teams had to listen to Chana Robina recite a poem by Natan Alterman in old Hebrew and then listen to a record of Alterman's songs. After hearing a number in the song, teams had to go to that numbered suite and find an Alterman impersonator, who directed them to the suite of Tel Aviv's first mayor, Meir Dizengoff. Teams sampled soup and then had to search among hundreds of bowl in the dining room for the soup that they sampled before receiving their next clue. Teams had to consume any bowl that they picked.
- After the soup task, teams had to drive to "Israel's most miniature airport", located at Mini Israel, and search for a clue with tickets to their first destination – Madrid, Spain – before checking into the Pit Stop.

Additional note

- Andrea & Ronnie arrived last at the Pit Stop; however, Ronit & Liran used their Salvage Pass to save them from elimination.

=== Leg 3 (Israel → Spain) ===
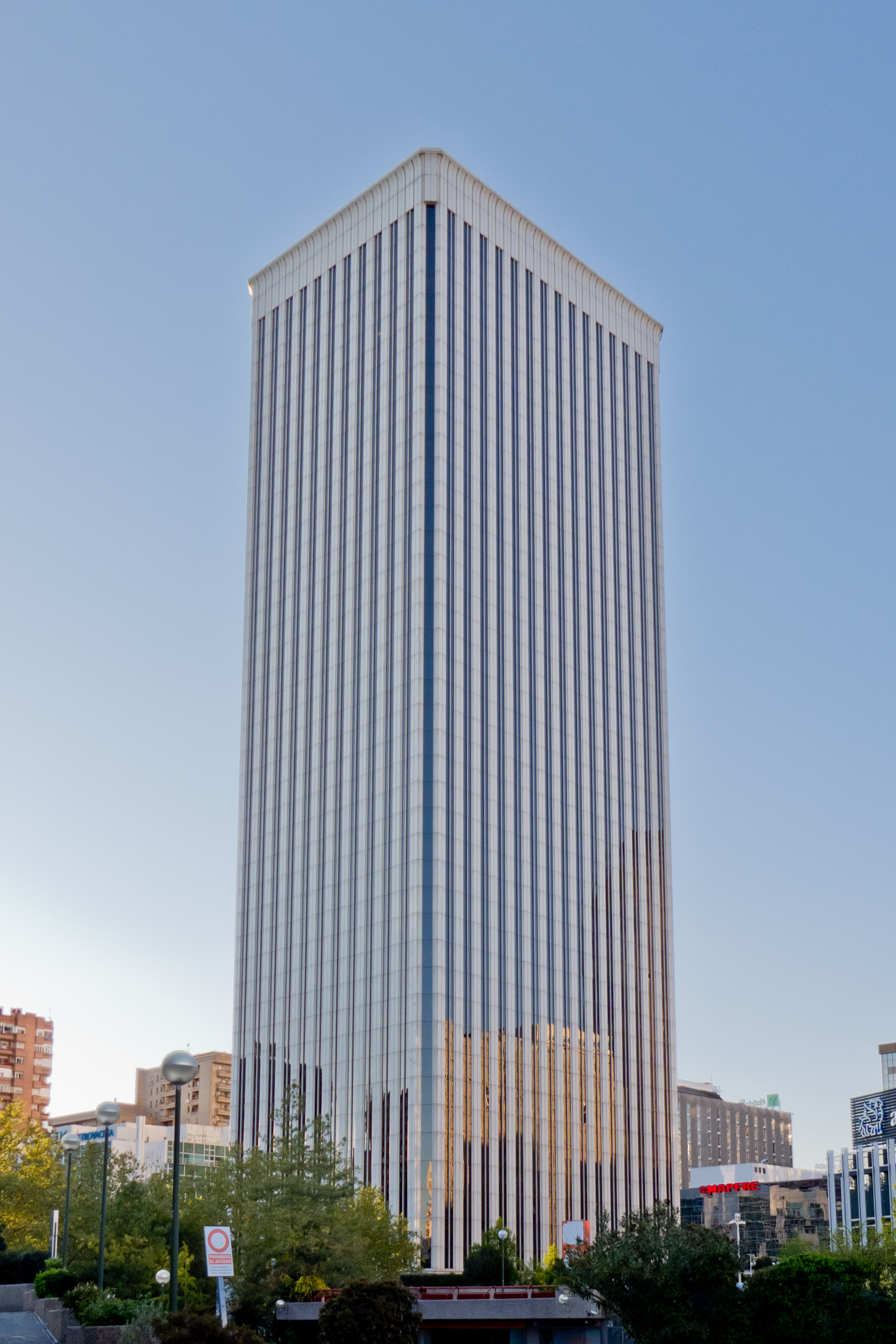
Madrid's Torre Picasso hosted the season's third Pit Stop.

- Episode 3 (18 May 2013), Episode 4 (22 May 2013) & Episode 5 (29 May 2013)
- Prizes: A gift card (awarded to Debbie & Dana) and ₪3,000 (awarded to Andrea & Ronnie)
- Withdrew: Andrea & Ronnie

Locations

- Tel Aviv (Ben Gurion Airport) → Madrid, Spain (Madrid–Barajas Airport)
- Moralzarzal (Plaza de Toros)
- Madrid (Amor de Dios & Villa Rosa or Calle de Fuencarral Shops)
- Madrid (Calle Ave María (in Spanish))
- Madrid (Calle del Doctor Esquerdo (in Spanish) – Martinez's Vegetable Shop)
- Madrid (Fernán Núñez Palace (in Spanish))
- Madrid (Hotel Meliá Galgos) (Overnight Rest)
- Brunete (Plaza Mayor)
- Madrid (Puerta del Sol)
- Madrid (Torre Picasso)

Episode summary (Episode 3)

- During the Pit Stop, teams were flown to Madrid, Spain. Once there, teams were instructed to drive to the Plaza de Toros in Moralzarzal and find their next clue.
- In this season's first Roadblock, one team member had to participate in bullfighting. They had to dress as a matador, let a bull pass through the cape thrice, and then plant a ribbon on him before receiving their next clue.
- After the Roadblock, teams voted to U-Turn another team.
- This leg's Detour was a choice between Flamenco (פלמנקו) or Macarena (מקרנה). In Flamenco, teams had to learn Flamenco dance moves, travel in costume to Villa Rosa, and perform to the satisfaction of a panel of judges before receiving their next clue. In Macarena, teams had to dress up in 90's-esque outfits and stand like statues in a store window. When a passerby pushed a button outside of the window, teams had to perform the Macarena, and when the button was pushed fifteen times, teams received their next clue.
- After the Detour, teams found the U-Turn reveal board on Calle Ave María.

Episode summary (Episode 4)

- Teams found their next clue at Martinez's Vegetable Shop. They had to put on fake mustaches and load their car with 50 cauliflowers, which remained until the end of the leg. Teams then had to walk back-to-back with their arms link through the next task at the Fernán Núñez Palace.
- Teams entered a room with items listed with their Hebrew names and had to figure out that all of these items contain the same letters for the password "Salvador Dalí" before an hourglass emptied so they could receive their next clue. If teams were unsuccessful, they had to solve a surrealist jigsaw puzzle, which did not have a rectangular shape.
- Teams were brought into another room, placed honey on their mustaches, stuck their head into a box with 4000 flies, and had to eat an apple covered in honey without using their hands before receiving their next clue. Teams then spent the night in a hotel.

Episode summary (Episode 5)

- The next day, teams had to travel to Plaza Mayor in Brunete and find their next clue.
- For this leg's Duel, one member from each team had to search through a pile of tomatoes for one containing a marker, while the opposing racers and locals pelted them with tomatoes, much like during La Tomatina festival. The first racer to find a marker received their next clue, while the losing team had to wait for another team. The team that lost the final Duel had to wait out a 15-minute penalty.
- After the Duel, teams found their next clue at Puerta del Sol. Teams had to dress up as Don Quixote and Sancho Panza and perform one of four of chivalric deeds. They had to carry someone, carry bags, act as a step stool, or place a cloth over a puddle. Then, teams had to give someone a ride on a hobby horse before receiving an ID card with the full name of Pablo Picasso excluding Pablo and Picasso, which teams used to figure out the location of the Pit Stop: the Torre Picasso.

Additional note

- Teams were given the option to hire a driver until the overnight rest but had to provide all directions.
- Five teams chose to use the U-Turn on Ma'ayan & Bat-El.
- At the start of the second day, Andrea & Ronnie chose to withdraw after Ronnie sustained an injury during the Roadblock.

=== Leg 4 (Spain) ===
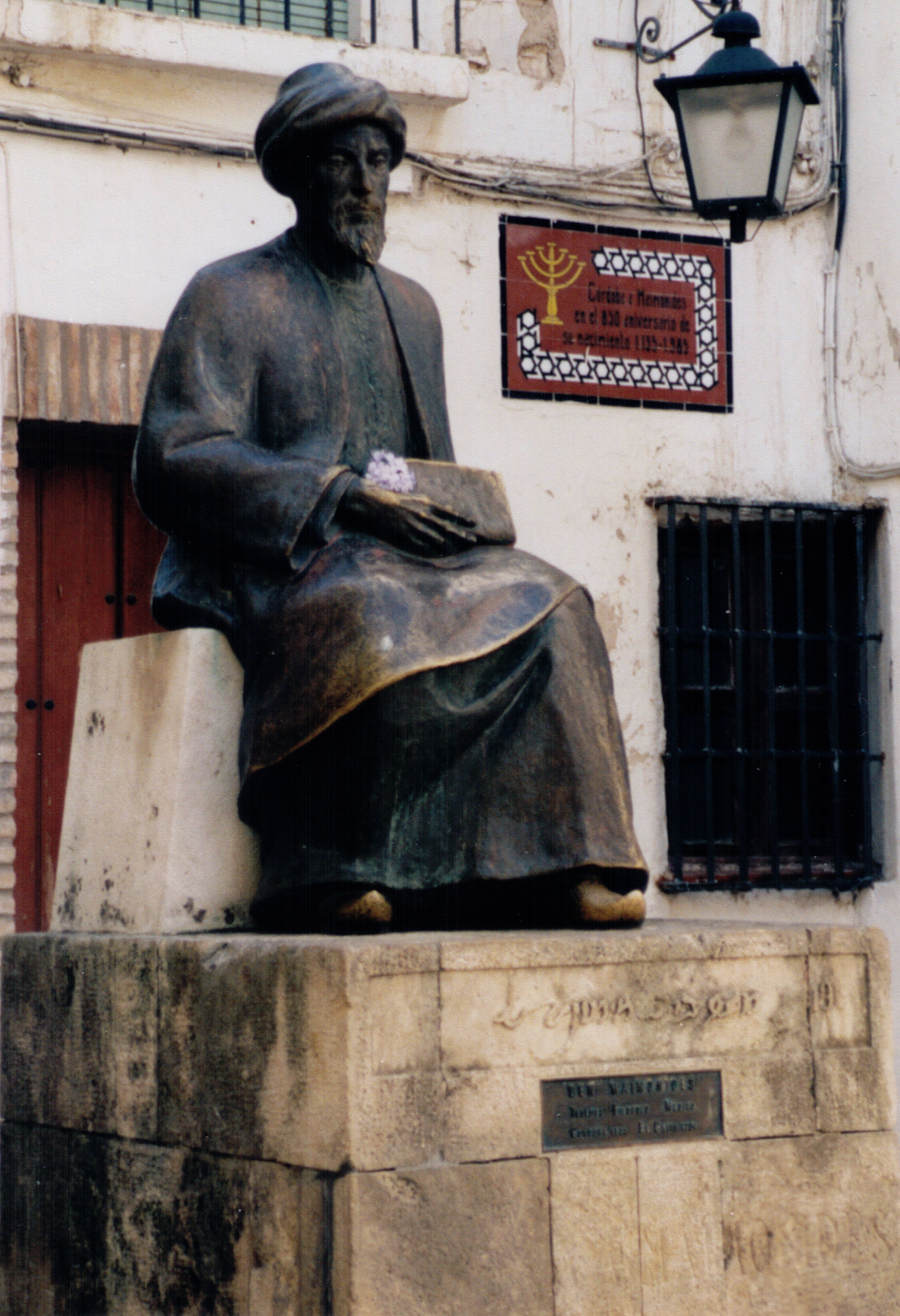
On this leg, teams visited the statue of Maimonides in Córdoba.

- Episode 6 (1 June 2013), Episode 7 (5 June 2013) & Episode 8 (8 June 2013)
- Prizes: A gift package (awarded to Romi & Coral) and ₪4,000 (awarded to Ronit & Liran)
- Eliminated: Ronit & Liran

Locations

- Madrid (Calle de Diego de León)
- Madrid (Madrid Atocha Railway Station) → Córdoba (Córdoba Railway Station)
- Córdoba (Hammam Al Andalus)
- Córdoba (Museum of the Inquisition)
- Córdoba (Statue of Maimonides)
- Córdoba (Cordoba Railway Station) → Seville (Seville-Santa Justa Railway Station)
- Seville (Calle Sierpes (in Spanish))
- Seville (Seville Cathedral)
- Seville (Plaza de España or Calle Sierpes)
- Seville (Torre del Oro)
- Seville (Taberna Sol y Sombra)
- Seville (Estadio de La Cartuja)
- Seville (Metropol Parasol)

Episode summary (Episode 6)

- At the start of this leg, teams were instructed to travel by train to Córdoba and find their next clue at Hammam Al Andalus. There, teams had to wash each other with four bars of soap, while being splashed with water at random intervals, until they found a marker saying "Inquisition", which they could exchange for their next clue. Teams had to carry two heavy logs across town to the Museum of the Inquisition.
- In this leg's Roadblock, one team member had to stick their hand into one of three pots, each filled with maggots, mice, or rotten meat, and retrieve a numbered card, which would determine how long their partner had to hold two heavy buckets up above their shoulders.
- From the Roadblock, teams received a one new shekel note, which has a picture of Maimonides, and had to find his statue in Córdoba. There, teams had to sing and dance with a rabbi, circling the statue four times, and then make a wish. After this, teams received tickets for one of two trains to Seville the next morning.

Episode summary (Episode 7)

- The next day, teams traveled by train to Seville and found their next clue on Calle Sierpes. There, teams had to dress in sleeping hats and had to convince locals to carry a bed to the Seville Cathedral while they slept on it. After voting to U-Turn a teams, teams had to mimic several funny faces made by winners of past "Funny Face Competitions" before receiving their next clue.
- This leg's Detour was a choice between King of Rugs (מלך השטיחים – Melkh HaShetyheym) or King of Serenades (מלך הסרנדות – Melkh HaSerenedot). In King of Rugs, teams had to travel to Plaza de España and clean a rug with a rug beater before receiving their next clue. In King of Serenades, teams had to join a group of troubadours and sing a serenade in Hebrew to a woman. They had to hand over a violet to the local every time the word "violet" was sung. Halfway through the song, team members had to switch roles and then received their next clue after completing the song.
- After the Detour, teams found the U-Turn reveal board at the Torre del Oro.

Episode summary (Episode 8)

- Teams found their next clue at the Sol y Sombra Tavern and had to eat eight Chorizo sausages weighing a total of two kilograms (4.4 lb). Once complete, teams had to travel to the Estadio de La Cartuja, where one team member had to score a goal in soccer against two defenders, while their partner cried "GOOOOOAL!" at a minimum decibel level before receiving their next clue. Teams then had to search among the stadium's 60,000 seats for their next clue, which directed them to the Pit Stop: Metropol Parasol. However, some envelopes simply contained a card saying "Try again".

Additional note

- This leg featured a Double U-Turn. Five teams chose to use the U-Turn on Debbie & Dana, and Debbie & Dana chose to use the U-Turn on Mor & Lior.

=== Leg 5 (Spain → France) ===
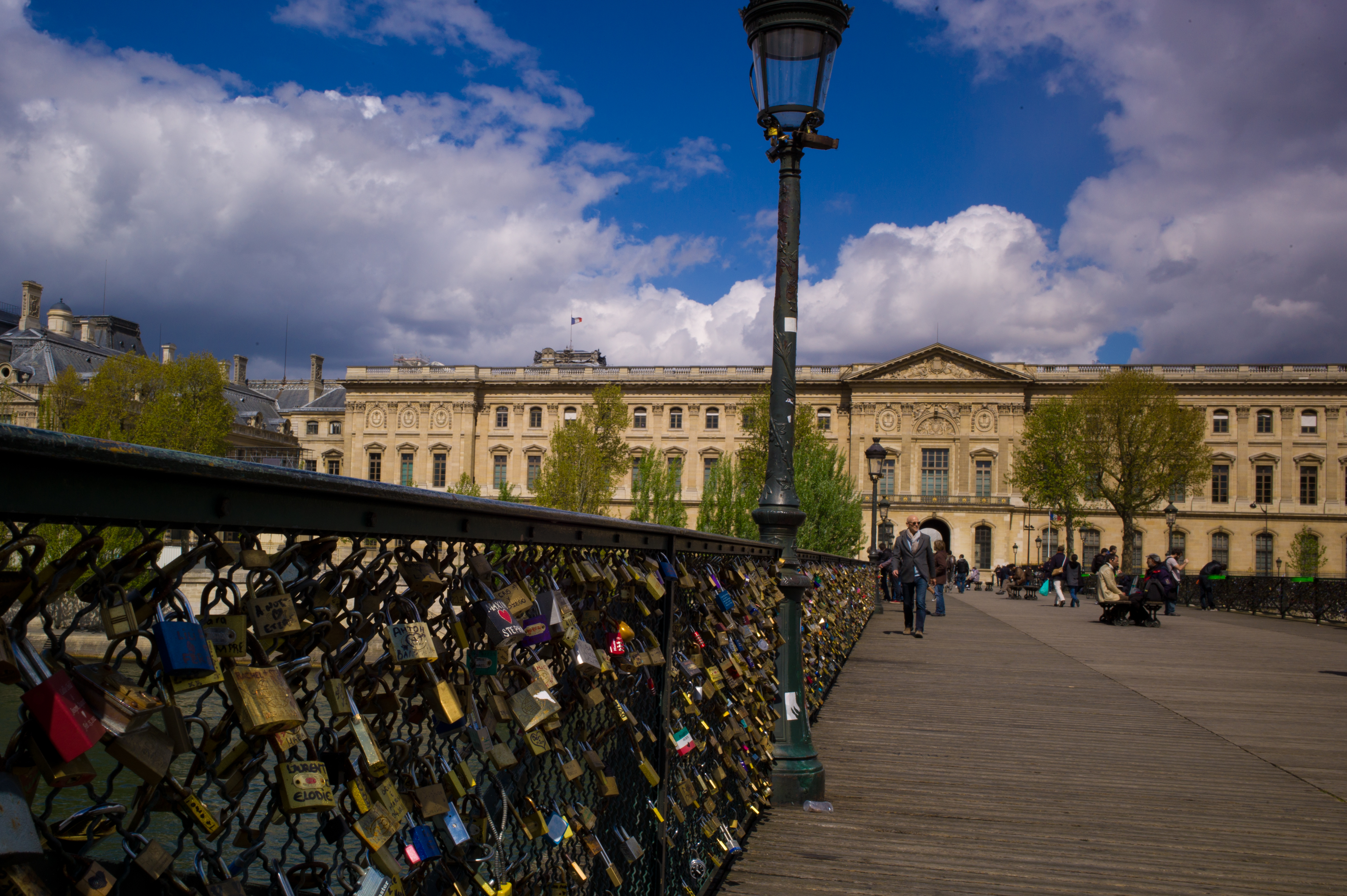
During the Roadblock in Paris, one team member had to find a lock that fits a given key at the Pont des Arts.

- Episode 9 (12 June 2013), Episode 10 (15 June 2013) & Episode 11 (19 June 2013)
- Prize: A gift card (awarded to David & Eliran)

Locations

- Seville (Walls of Seville)
- Seville (Seville Airport) → Paris, France (Orly Airport)
- Paris (Passerelle Debilly)
- Paris (Théâtre Le Ranelagh)
- Paris (Hôtel Particulier Montmartre or Place des Abbesses)
- Paris (Place Jean-Marais)
- Paris (Place du Tertre)
- Paris (Passage Jouffroy – Le Salon des Miroirs)
- Paris (Pont des Arts)
- Paris (Pavillon Kléber)
- Paris (Arc de Triomphe)

Episode summary (Episode 9)

- At the start of this leg, teams received a tablet computer that played the national anthem of their next destination, and they had to identify that they were traveling to Paris, France, before they could purchase their plane tickets. Once there, teams were instructed that they could only speak Hebrew until the Yield reveal board and to travel to the Passerelle Debilly. There, teams encountered a mime whose performance imitated can-can dancers, which teams had to identify before receiving a garter listing their next destination: the Théâtre Le Ranelagh. After voting to Yield another team, teams had to perform a can-can dance in costume to the satisfaction of a judge before receiving their next clue.
- This leg's Detour was a choice between Marie Antoinette (מארי אנטואנט) or Cotton Candy (צמר גפן מתוק – Tzemer Gefen Metoq). In Marie Antoinette, teams had to eat the raw ingredients of cake including edible candles while wearing a corset before receiving their next clue. In Cotton Candy, teams had to eat a large serving of cotton candy while on a carousel before it stopped in order to receive their next clue. Each racer could only hold onto the cotton candy with one hand.

Episode summary (Episode 10)

- After the Detour, teams found the Yield reveal board and their next clue at Place Jean-Marais. Teams had to walk and pamper a small dog to Place du Tertre, where they received a caricature of them and their dog and their next clue.
- For this leg's Duel, two teams had to walk on a French fashion catwalk wearing underwear, either personal or provided fashionable underwear, with their dog. A panel of professionals judged teams on their poise, style, timing, and charisma and chose one team as a winner. The losing team had to wait for another team. The team that lost the final Duel had to wait out a 15-minute penalty.

Episode summary (Episode 11)

- After the Duel, teams found their next clue on the Pont des Arts.
- In this leg's Roadblock, one team member had to dress as Quasimodo with an eight-kilogram (18 lb) "hump" on their back and use a key provided by Esmeralda to unlock a love lock hidden amongst hundreds of locks and receive their next clue. For every unsuccessful attempt, their partner had to ring a bell declaring their failure in love.
- After the Roadblock, teams had to travel to Pavilion Kleber, stack 364 champagne coupes into a 12-level pyramid with only one coupe on the top level, and then pour a magnum of champagne onto the top of the pyramid without breaking any glasses before receiving their next clue, which directed them to the Pit Stop: the Arc de Triomphe. Every five minutes, teams had to drink a coupe of champagne.
- To check into the Pit Stop, teams had two minutes to ask 21 yes or no questions and identify the costume of the greeter, who was hidden from view and dressed as a well-known French icon: a baguette. If teams were unsuccessful, they had to serve a 15-minute penalty before another attempt.

Additional notes

- Four teams chose to use the Yield on Debbie & Dana.
- This was a non-elimination leg.

=== Leg 6 (France → Brazil) ===
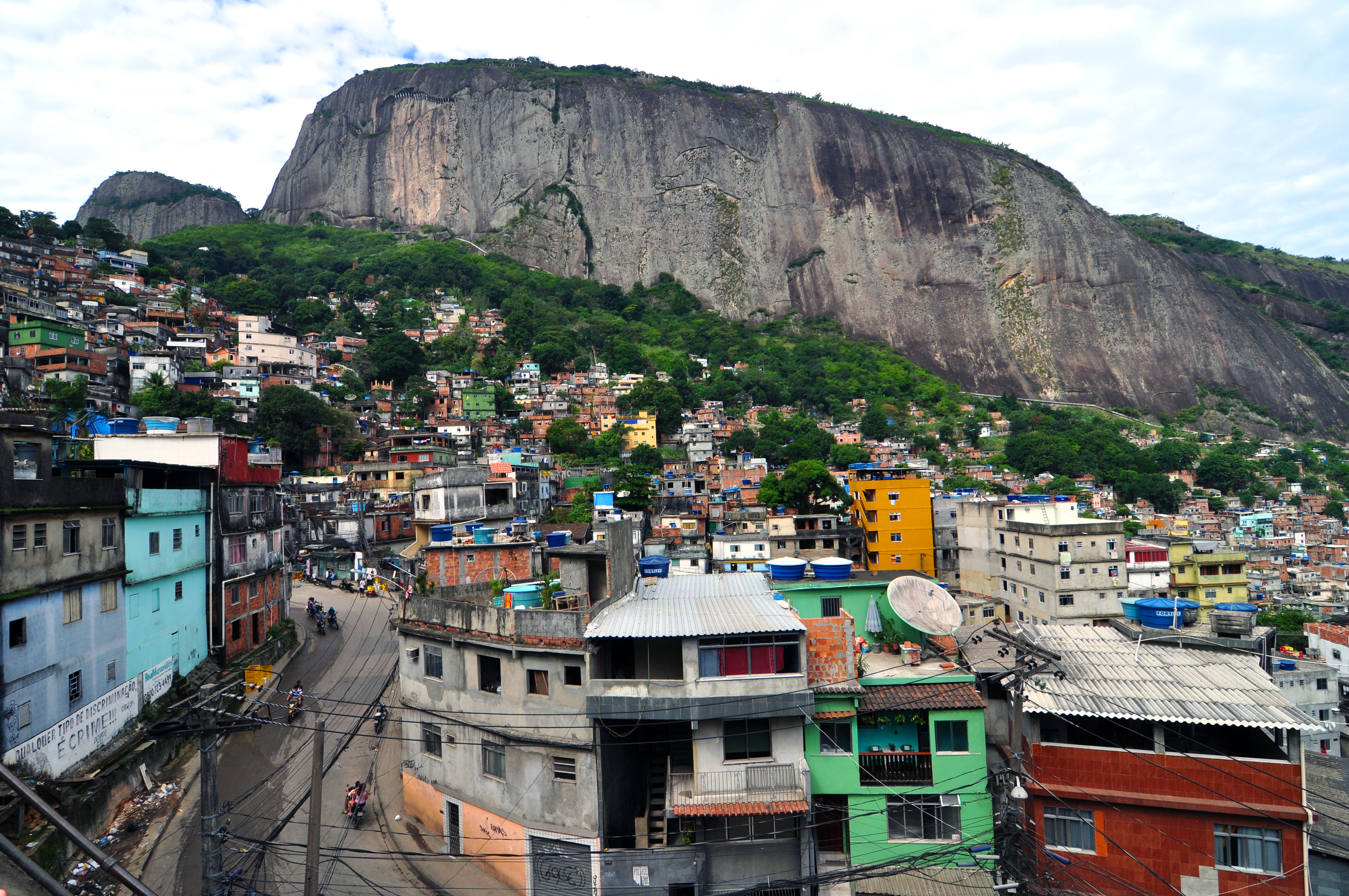
Teams visited the Rocinha favela while in Rio de Janeiro.

- Episode 12 (22 June 2013), Episode 13 (26 June 2013) & Episode 14 (29 June 2013)
- Prizes: A gift card (awarded to Itzik & Eliran) and ₪5,000 (awarded to Shimi & Yasmin)
- Eliminated: Shimi & Yasmin

Locations

- Paris (Paris Marriott Rive Gauche Hotel & Conference Center)
- Paris (Charles de Gaulle Airport) → Rio de Janeiro, Brazil (Rio de Janeiro/Galeão International Airport)
- Rio de Janeiro (Rua Anita Garibaldi)
- Rio de Janeiro (Copacabana Beach)
- Rio de Janeiro (Pepino Beach)
  - Rio de Janeiro (Abricó Beach)
- Rocinha (Peniel's Key Stand)
- Rocinha (Porta do Céu)
- Rocinha (Soccer Field or Coffee Shop)
- Rocinha (Lookout)
- Rio de Janeiro (Federal University of Rio de Janeiro)
- Rio de Janeiro (Arpoador Park)

Episode summary (Episode 12)

- At the start of this leg, teams were instructed to fly to Rio de Janeiro, Brazil. Once there, teams found their next clue on Rua Anita Garibaldi. Teams had to learn the samba from a professional dancer and then dance continuously with their instructor until the end of the Roadblock, except when performing other tasks only once while riding the city bus.
- After traveling to Copacabana Beach, teams voted to U-Turn another team and then had to look for a sand sculpture of sunbathers with an arrow pointing them towards their next clue, which instructed them to perform 30 minutes of Brazilian aerobics. Once complete, teams had to travel by bus to Pepino Beach.
- In this leg's Roadblock, one team member had to hang glide from Pedra Bonita down to Pepino Beach and then swim to their partner, who was sitting on a surfboard, before receiving their next clue.

Episode summary (Episode 13)

- For this season's only Fast Forward, one team had to play frescoball, with the team discovering that the task was on a nude beach and they had to play while naked. Both team members had to play with a Brazilian couple and keep a ball in the air for 30 hits. Itzik & Eliran won the Fast Forward award.
- After the Roadblock, teams had to travel to Peniel's Key Stand in the favela of Rocinha, receive a key, find the Porta do Céu, unlock the door, and find their next clue.
- This leg's Detour was a choice between Football (כדורגל – Khedoregel) or Coffee (קפה – Qefeh). In Football, teams had to play a game of the one in the middle with a group of locals. One racer had to stand in the middle, get the ball away from a group of four, and pass it to their partner, who had to score a goal against a goalkeeper before receiving their next clue. In Coffee, teams had to match five cups of coffee with their coffee grounds before receiving their next clue.
- After the Detour, teams found the U-Turn reveal board at a lookout.

Episode summary (Episode 14)

- After traveling to the Federal University of Rio de Janeiro, teams found their next clue instructing them to endure a Brazilian body waxing session. They then had to perform a series of 12 bodybuilding poses for a panel of judges and score at least 10 points. Once done, teams received a tablet computer that played two songs – "Copacabana" and "The Girl from Ipanema" – and had to figure out that the Pit Stop was located between the two beaches at Arpoador Park.

Additional note

- Four teams chose to use the U-Turn on Ma'ayan & Bat-El.

=== Leg 7 (Brazil → Cuba) ===
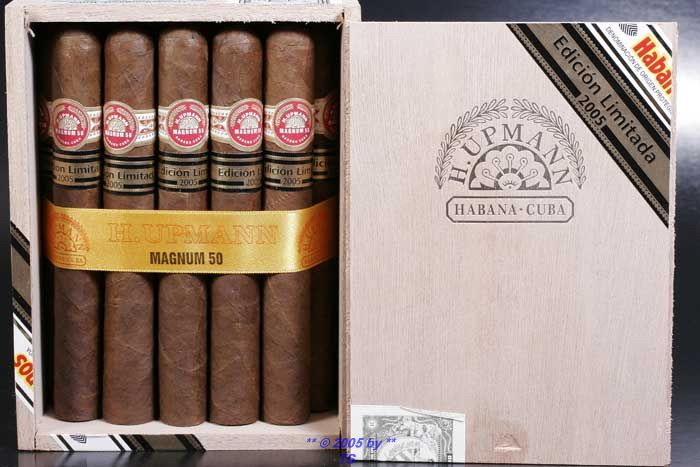
In a cigar factory in Havana, one team member had to roll a H. Upmann cigar.

- Episode 16 (6 July 2013), Episode 17 (10 July 2013) & Episode 18 (13 July 2013)
- Prize: A gift package (awarded to Talia & Koby)

Locations

- Rio de Janeiro (Novotel RJ Santos Dumont Hotel)
- Rio de Janeiro (Rio de Janeiro/Galeão International Airport) → Havana, Cuba (José Martí International Airport)
- Havana (H. Upmann Cigar Factory)
- Havana (Old Havana – El Floridita Bar & Hotel Ambos Mundos)
- Havana (Old Havana – Santería Priestess Residence)
- Havana (Old Havana – Hospital Street & Callejon de Hamel)
- Havana (Old Havana – Parque Cespedes)
- Havana (Old Havana – Plaza de la Catedral or O'Reilly Street Barbershop)
- Havana (Old Havana Pub)
- Havana (Parque Martires del 71)
- Havana (Hotel Nacional de Cuba)

Episode summary (Episode 16)

- At the start of this leg, teams were instructed to fly to Havana, Cuba. Once there, teams were instructed to drive a classic car and drive themselves to the H. Upmann Cigar Factory, where one team member had to make three Cuban cigars while wearing a blindfold with their partner giving them directions as the history of Cuban cigars was broadcast in Spanish over a loudspeaker as a distraction before receiving their next clue.
- For this leg's Duel, teams had to balance a tray of 12 daiquiris with one hand from each racer and carry them from the El Floridita Bar through a street festival to the Hotel Ambos Mundos. The team that spilled the least liquid below the red line received their next clue, while the losing team had to wait for another team. If there was a tie, then the first team to reach the hotel would win. The team that lost the final Duel had to wait out a 15-minute penalty.
- After the Duel, teams had to drive to a Santería residence and receive a blessing from the priestess before receiving their next clue.

Episode summary (Episode 17)

- On Hospital Street, teams had to find a fortune teller, who read their fortune with Tarot cards, and then vote to U-Turn another team. Teams then found their next clue at Parque Cespedes.
- This leg's Detour was a choice between Cuban Party (מסיבה קובנית – Mesibah Qubeneyt) or Cuban Barbershop (מספרה קובנית – Mesperah Qubeneyt). In Cuban Party, teams had to give bandanas to at least 40 locals and lead them dancing down the streets before receiving their next clue. In Cuban Barbershop, teams had to convince two men to undergo a barber's treatment, involving shampooing their hair, massaging their scalp, and shaving their facial hair before receiving their next clue.
- After the Detour, teams found the U-Turn reveal board at a pub.

Episode summary (Episode 18)

- Teams had to search for a Cuban hitchhiker at Parque Martires del 71 and drive them to their house. Once there, they had to take a 30-minute break during which they could eat dinner and spend time with the local. Towards the end of their visit, the Cuban family would deliver them a package that had been sent from the teams' families in Israel. Teams then received their next clue, which directed them to the Pit Stop: the Hotel Nacional de Cuba.

Additional notes

- Four teams chose to use the U-Turn on Mor & Lior.
- This was a non-elimination leg.

=== Leg 8 (Cuba) ===
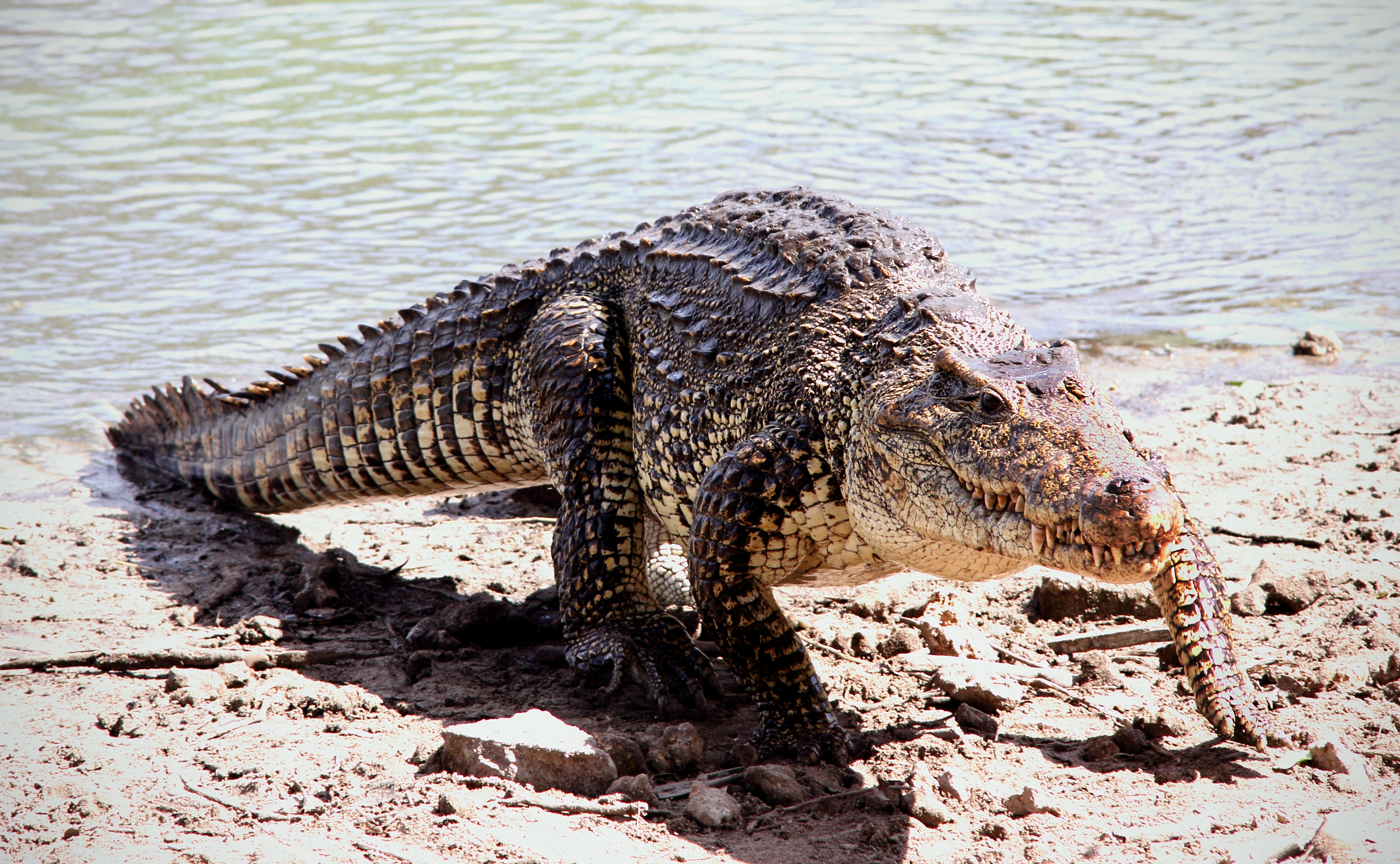
At the crocodile farm in Ciénaga de Zapata, teams had to catch a Cuban crocodile to receive their next clue.

- Episode 19 (17 July 2013) & Episode 20 (20 July 2013)
- Prizes: A pampering treatment (awarded to Talia & Koby) and ₪6,000 (awarded to Mor & Lior)
- Eliminated: Mor & Lior

Locations

- Havana (Hotel Meliá Habana)
- Ciénaga de Zapata (Crocodile Farm)
- Ciénaga de Zapata (Soplillar Village)
- Matanzas (Victoria de Girón – Campismo Popular)
- Matanzas (Victoria de Girón – Green Bar)
- Matanzas (Playa Shackleton)
- Matanzas (Beach)
- Matanzas (Playa Centro de Fionros)
- Ciénaga de Zapata (Boca de Guama)

Episode summary (Episode 19)

- At the start of this leg, teams were instructed to travel to a crocodile farm in Ciénaga de Zapata, where they had to catch eight baby Cuban crocodiles and then use a stick and rope to wrangle a full grown Cuban crocodile before receiving their next clue. Teams then had to travel to Soplillar Village and find their next clue.
- For this leg's Duel, two teams had to compete in a horse-drawn cart race. The first team to cross the finish line won, while the losing team had to wait for another team. The team that lost the final Duel had to wait out a 15-minute penalty.
- After the Duel, teams voted to U-Turn another team and took a 25-minute break from racing at Campismo Popular, during which they could eat fruit, drink fruit juice, and write a message to their loved ones at home before placing it in a bottle and tossing it out to sea.

Episode summary (Episode 20)

- Once at the Green Bar, teams had to dress up as pirates, including an eyepatch, for the rest of the leg before traveling to Playa Shackleton.
- This leg's Detour was a choice between Robbery at Sea (שוד בים – Shod Beyem) or Robbery in the Air (שוד באוויר – Shod Baveyer). In Robbery at Sea, teams had to retrieve items from a boat moored off shore and carry them back to shore, including a pirate who they had to carry with at least one of the objects, before receiving their next clue. In Robbery in the Air , teams were suspended in a net hanging in the air and had to use ropes to grab a hanging flag and satchel of money, which they could exchange for their next clue.
- After the Detour, teams found the U-Turn reveal board before traveling to Playa Centro de Fionros. There, one team member was buried up to their head in the sand, while their partner poured bottles of sticky, slimy liquids on top of their head until they found a small pearl. After placing the pearl in a treasure chest, teams received a treasure map, which directed them to the Pit Stop: Boca de Guama.

Additional note

- Four teams chose to use the U-Turn on Mor & Lior.

=== Leg 9 (Cuba → United States) ===
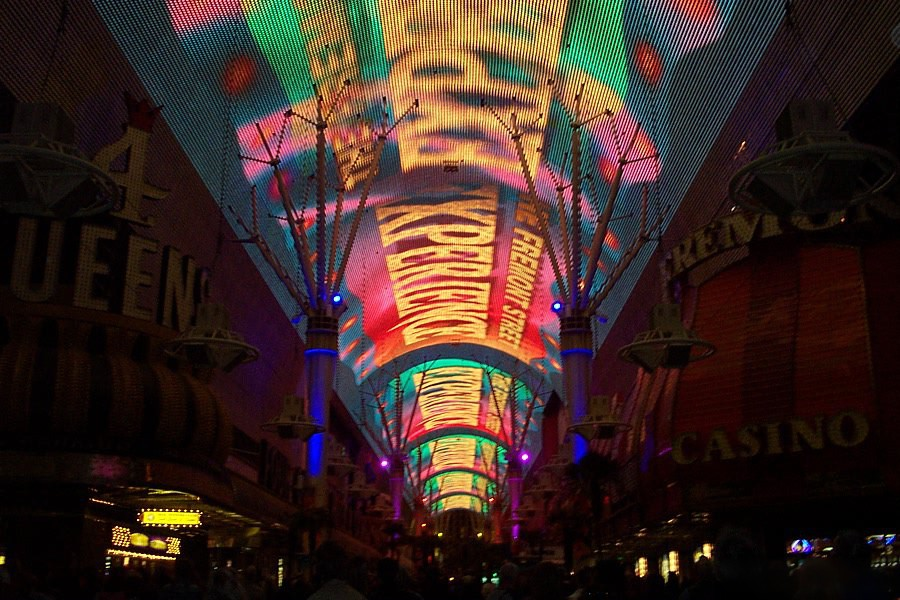
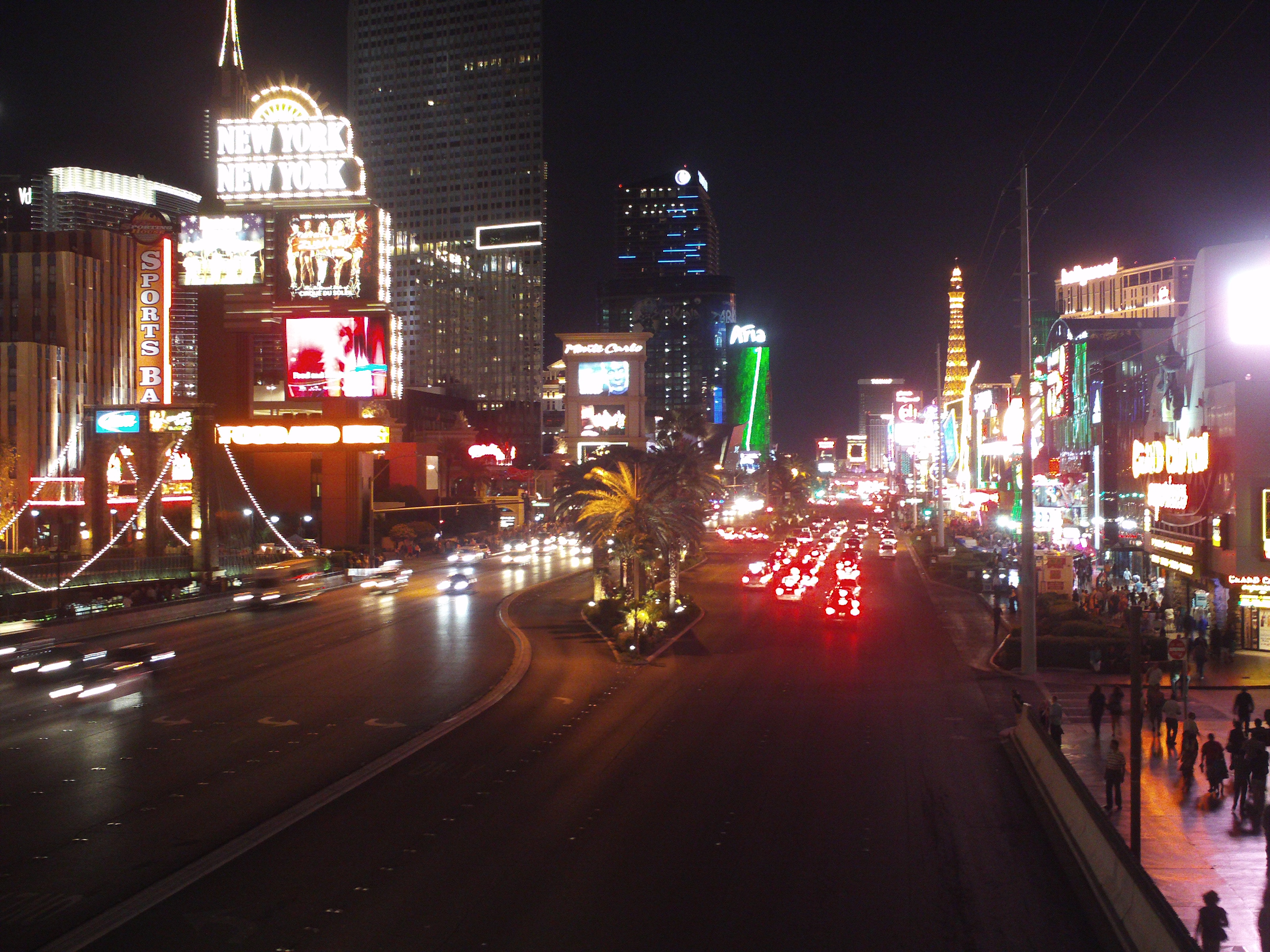
While in the Las Vegas Valley, teams visited various areas on the Las Vegas Strip including Fremont Street and the Las Vegas Boulevard.
- Episode 21 (24 July 2013), Episode 22 (27 July 2013), Episode 23 (31 July 2013) & Episode 24 (3 August 2013)

Locations

- Havana (Hotel Meliá Habana)
- Havana (José Martí International Airport) → Las Vegas, United States (McCarran International Airport)
- Las Vegas (Fremont Street Experience)
- Las Vegas (Harley Davidson Cafe)
- Las Vegas (Little White Wedding Chapel & Las Vegas City Hall)
- Las Vegas (Intersection of Las Vegas Boulevard & Fremont Street)
- Las Vegas (Tropicana Avenue) (Overnight Rest)
- Las Vegas (Star Costume & Theatrical Supply)
- Las Vegas (Roxy's Diner)
- Las Vegas (Dino's Lounge)
- Las Vegas (Golden Gate Hotel and Casino & Golden Nugget Las Vegas)
- Las Vegas (Stratosphere Tower)
- Las Vegas (Intersection of Giles Street & Ali Baba Lane)

Episode summary (Episode 21)

- At the start of this leg, teams were instructed to fly to Las Vegas in the United States. Once there, teams were instructed to travel to the Fremont Street Experience, where they found a carnival prize wheel numbered from one to six. Teams had to spin wheel and received their next clue based on the order of their numbers.
- Teams traveled to the Harley Davidson Cafe, where they had to win an arm wrestling match against a patron, and then both team members had to drink a glass of non-alcoholic beer within two minutes before receiving their next clue. After traveling to the Little White Wedding Chapel on Harley-Davidson motorcycles, teams had to find a couple willing to get married, bring them to City Hall to get a marriage license, and then take part in the wedding at the chapel before receiving their next clue.

Episode summary (Episode 22)

- Teams had to search the intersection of Las Vegas Boulevard and Fremont Street for a limousine with their next clue.
- For this leg's Duel, two teams had to play a simplified version of strip poker. Each team was dealt a card, and the team with the lower card had to take off an article of clothing, with aces considered high. When one team refused to continue or had nothing else to remove, they had to wait for another team, while the other team received their next clue. The team that lost the final Duel had to wait out a 15-minute penalty and walk the streets naked while wearing a cardboard box saying "I just lost a game of strip poker".
- After the Duel, teams voted to Yield another team on Tropicana Avenue before spending the night at a hotel.

Episode summary (Episode 23)

- The next day, teams had to don a single 7XL shirt and 7XL pants at Star Costume and remain in these clothes until they reached Dino's Lounge.
- After traveling to Roxy's Diner, teams encountered an Intersection, where teams were required to work together in pairs and complete tasks until further notice. The teams were paired up thusly: David & Eliran and Talia & Koby, Romi & Coral and Ma'ayan & Bat-El, and Debbie & Dana and Eliran & Itzik. After pairing up, teams had to eat a 2.5-kilogram (5.5 lb) hamburger before receiving their next clue. After this task, teams were no longer joined.
- After the Intersection, teams found the Yield reveal board at Dino's Lounge. Then, teams had to dress up as Elvis Presley, watch a video of Presley's performances, and then perform the video's song to the satisfaction of an Elvis impersonator before receiving their next clue.

Episode summary (Episode 24)

- Teams found their next clue at the Golden Gate Hotel and Casino.
- In this leg's first Roadblock, one team member had to change out of their Elvis costume and into a superhero outfit within 20 seconds while in a revolving door. Then, they had to carry both their partner and a cut-out design of a car, keeping both off the ground and the car above their head, and search Fremont Street for a woman dressed as a princess outside of the Golden Nugget Las Vegas before receiving their next clue.
- After the first Roadblock, teams found their next clue at the Stratosphere Tower.
- In this leg's second Roadblock, the team member who did not perform the previous Roadblock had to perform a 252-metre (827 ft) SkyJump off the Stratosphere Tower before receiving their next clue, which directed them to the Pit Stop.
- After traveling to the intersection of Giles Street and Ali Baba Lane near the Mandalay Bay, teams found an empty Pit Stop mat and were then picked by a limousine with a Marilyn Monroe impersonator and Ron Shahar.

Additional notes

- Due to the United States embargo against Cuba, teams flew to Las Vegas via Panama City, Panama.
- Three teams each chose to use the Yield on David & Eliran and Debbie & Dana.
- There was no elimination at the end of this leg; all teams were instead instructed to continue racing.

=== Leg 10 (United States) ===
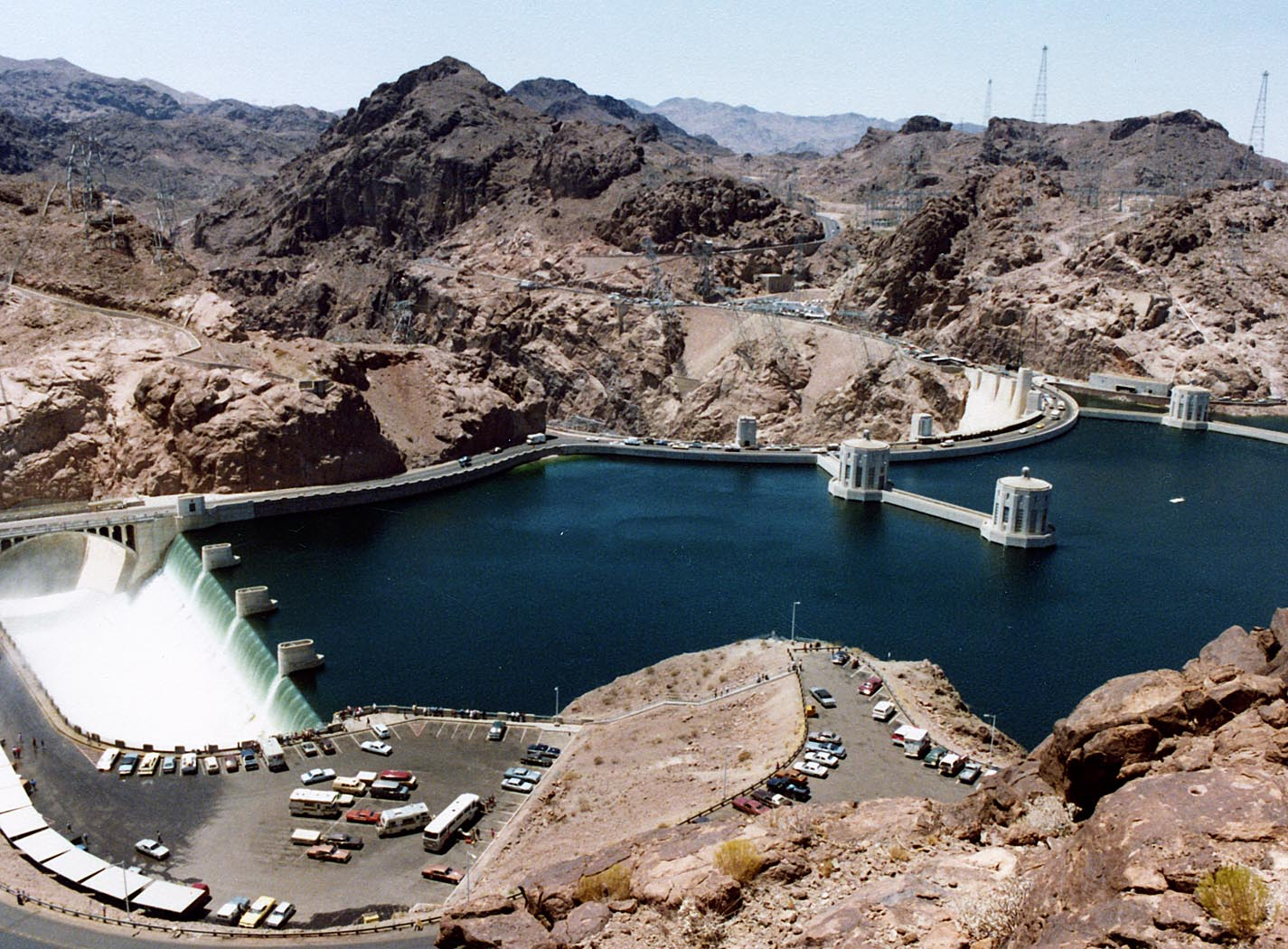
The Hoover Dam in Nevada served as the tenth Pit Stop.

- Episode 25 (7 August 2013) & Episode 26 (10 August 2013)
- Prize: ₪7,000 (awarded to Itzik & Eliran)
- Eliminated: Itzik & Eliran

Locations

- West Las Vegas (Dig This! Heavy Equipment Playground)
- West Las Vegas (Halloween-Themed House)
- Las Vegas (Howard Johnson Hotel) (Overnight Rest)
- Las Vegas (Longevity Sports Center)
- Boulder City (Boulder City Airport)
- Boulder City (A&W Parking Lot)
- Clark County (Hoover Dam)

Episode summary (Episode 25)

- At the start of this leg, teams were instructed to travel to Dig This! Heavy Equipment Playground. There, teams had to watch a video, which incorporated the Hebrew names of various American horror films, figure out the theme of horror movies, and inform the gate guard before receiving their next clue and be granted entry.
- In this season's final Roadblock, one team member had to be buried alive in a wooden crate, simulating the actions of the American Mafia, for 10 minutes before receiving their next clue.
- After the Roadblock, teams had to find a Halloween-themed house and perform three tasks, by blindly choosing from two "Trick" tasks and two "Treat" ones, before receiving their next clue. The trick tasks were to kiss a frog and for each racer to bob for five apples. The treat tasks were to eat a very large gummy bear and to take a pie in the face. Once complete, teams were brought to a dunk tank. One team member had to dunk their partner into the tank, and the dunked racer had to find a small flag before receiving their next clue. Teams then spent the night in a hotel.

Episode summary (Episode 26)

- The next day, teams had to play American football against four members of the Lingerie Football League at the Longevity Sports Center and score a touchdown before receiving their next clue. Teams were then driven to the Boulder City Airport in an 18-wheeler, which played a message from their loved ones. There, team members had to pull an 18-wheeler across a marked red line before receiving their next clue. Teams then had to join a bikini car wash at a nearby parking lot. They had to charge $3 per car wash alongside tips and had to make enough gas money for their truck driver to get them to the Pit Stop: the Hoover Dam.

Additional note

- After checking in at the Pit Stop, teams received video messages from their loved ones. After this, teams participated in a task for fun that involved matching all eleven teams with their baby pictures.

=== Leg 11 (United States) ===
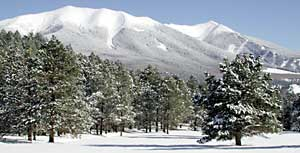
The Arizona Snowbowl was visited during this leg in Arizona.

- Episode 28 (17 August 2013), Episode 29 (21 August 2013) & Episode 31 (28 August 2013)
- Prizes: A gift card (awarded to Romi & Coral) and ₪8,000 (awarded to Debbie & Dana)
- Eliminated: Debbie & Dana

Locations

- Clark County (Hoover Dam) → Flagstaff (DoubleTree Flagstaff)
- Flagstaff (Arizona Snowbowl)
- Flagstaff (Flagstaff Nordic Center)
- Camp Verde (Wigwam Valley Ranch) (Overnight Rest)
- Black Canyon City (Canyon Creek Ranch)

Episode summary (Episode 28)

- During the Pit Stop, teams were transported by bus to Flagstaff. At the start of this leg, teams were instructed to travel to the Arizona Snowbowl and use an avalanche beacon to find and dig out a training mannequin. After securing the mannequin to a toboggan and sliding back down, teams receive a snow globe with their next destination printed on the inside: the Flagstaff Nordic Center. Teams then voted to U-Turn another team.
- For this season's final Duel, two teams competed in a sled dog relay race. One team member had to complete a leg and pass the snow globe to their partner, who had to complete the second leg. The team that finished first received their next clue, while the losing team had to wait for another team. The team that lost the final Duel had to wait out a 15-minute penalty.
- This leg's first Detour, each with a limit of three stations, was a choice between Collect (לאסוף – Lasof) or Haul (לסחוב – Leschob). In Collect, teams had to stack firewood until they made a rectangular stack at least two metres (6.6 ft) high before receiving their next clue. In Haul, both team members had to put on snowshoes and carry a person on their backs through a marked course before receiving their next clue.

Episode summary (Episode 29)

- Teams had to travel to Wigwam Valley Ranch and perform a Native American Hoop Dance before meeting with a tribal chief, who gave Native American garments feathers, and traditional Native American names, which they had to use to refer to each other for the remainder of the day. Teams then had to perform two Native American hunting exercises. One team member had to use a bow to shoot an arrow at a rolling target, and the other had to throw a spear at a target thrown in the air before receiving their next clue. If teams ran out of arrows or spears, they had to perform a traditional dance before their supply was replenished.
- After the hunting task, teams had to remove most of their clothing, enter a sweat lodge, and talk with the chief about the meaning of life. They then had to rub dirt on their skin to blend with mother earth, submerge themselves in icy water ten times, and return to the sweat lodge to warm up and receive their next clue. Teams then had to build a fire and assemble a teepee so that it matched an example before receiving their next clue. Teams then spent the night in their teepees.

Episode summary (Episode 31)

- The next day, teams traveled to Canyon Creek Ranch, where they had to dress up as cowboys/cowgirls and ride on horses to ranch's corral. There, teams had to herd three young cows with the same matching bandana into a small enclosure before receiving their next clue.
- This season's final Detour was a choice between Rodeo (רודיאו) or Country (קאנטרי). In Rodeo, both team members had to ride on a mechanical bull and stay on for 30 sequences before receiving their next clue. In Country, teams had to perform a country yodel before receiving their next clue.
- After the second Detour, one team member had to answer three questions about the other teams, and their partner had to match the answers by shooting a gun at targets with images of the teams before receiving their next clue. If racers answered incorrectly, the team was handcuffed and placed into jail to serve a time penalty. Once complete, teams had to search the old west town for a horseshoe and bring it to the Pit Stop behind the church.

Additional notes

- This leg featured a Double U-Turn for the first Detour. Three teams chose to use the U-Turn on Debbie & Dana, and Debbie & Dana chose to use the U-Turn on Talia & Koby.
- After this leg concluded, teams returned to Israel.

=== Leg 12 (Taiwan) ===
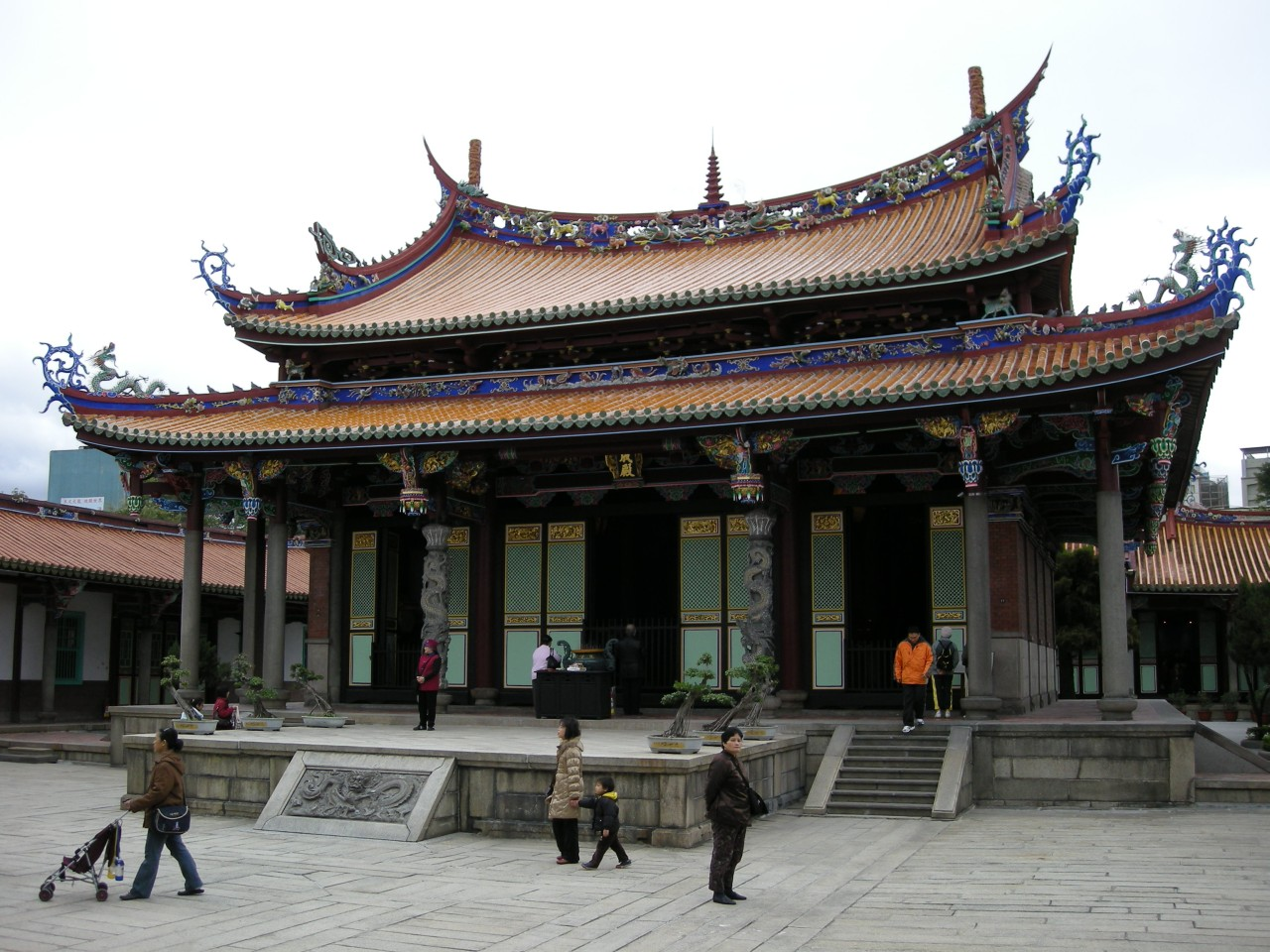
Taipei's Confucius Temple was visited on the penultimate leg.

- Episode 32 (29 August 2013)
- Prizes: A pampering treatment (awarded to Talia & Koby) and ₪9,000 (awarded to David & Eliran)
- Eliminated: David & Eliran

Locations

- Taipei, Taiwan (Chiang Kai-shek Memorial Hall)
- Taipei (Central Pictures Studio)
- Taipei (Sun Yat-sen Square)
- Taipei (Taipei Confucius Temple)
- Taipei (Raohe Street Night Market)
- Taipei (Ximending)

Episode summary

- Months later, after the season premiered, teams flew to Taipei, Taiwan, for the final two legs. At the start of this leg, teams were instructed to travel to Central Pictures Studio, where they had to sit on a swing set and sing Svika Pick's "Muzika" while the swing was lowered into a tank full of water and snakes were dumped onto them before receiving their next clue. Teams then went to Sun Yat-sen Square and had to sell 12 glasses of fruit juice before receiving board with their next destination – the Taipei Confucius Temple – written in Chinese through fruit pixel art.
- Once at the Taipei Confucius Temple, one team member had to perform a tai chi technique of balancing a book on their head while on one foot. Their partner had to listen to a Chinese proverb over a pay phone and say the sentence to them. Then, the tai chi practicing racer had to repeat the proverb before receiving their next clue. After multiple incorrect attempts, the tai chi practicing racer had to switch to holding a plate of stinky tofu to their nose. Teams then had to search Raohe Street Night Market for the next clue, which was a leaflet written in Hebrew that directed teams to the Pit Stop: Ximending.

=== Leg 13 (Taiwan) ===
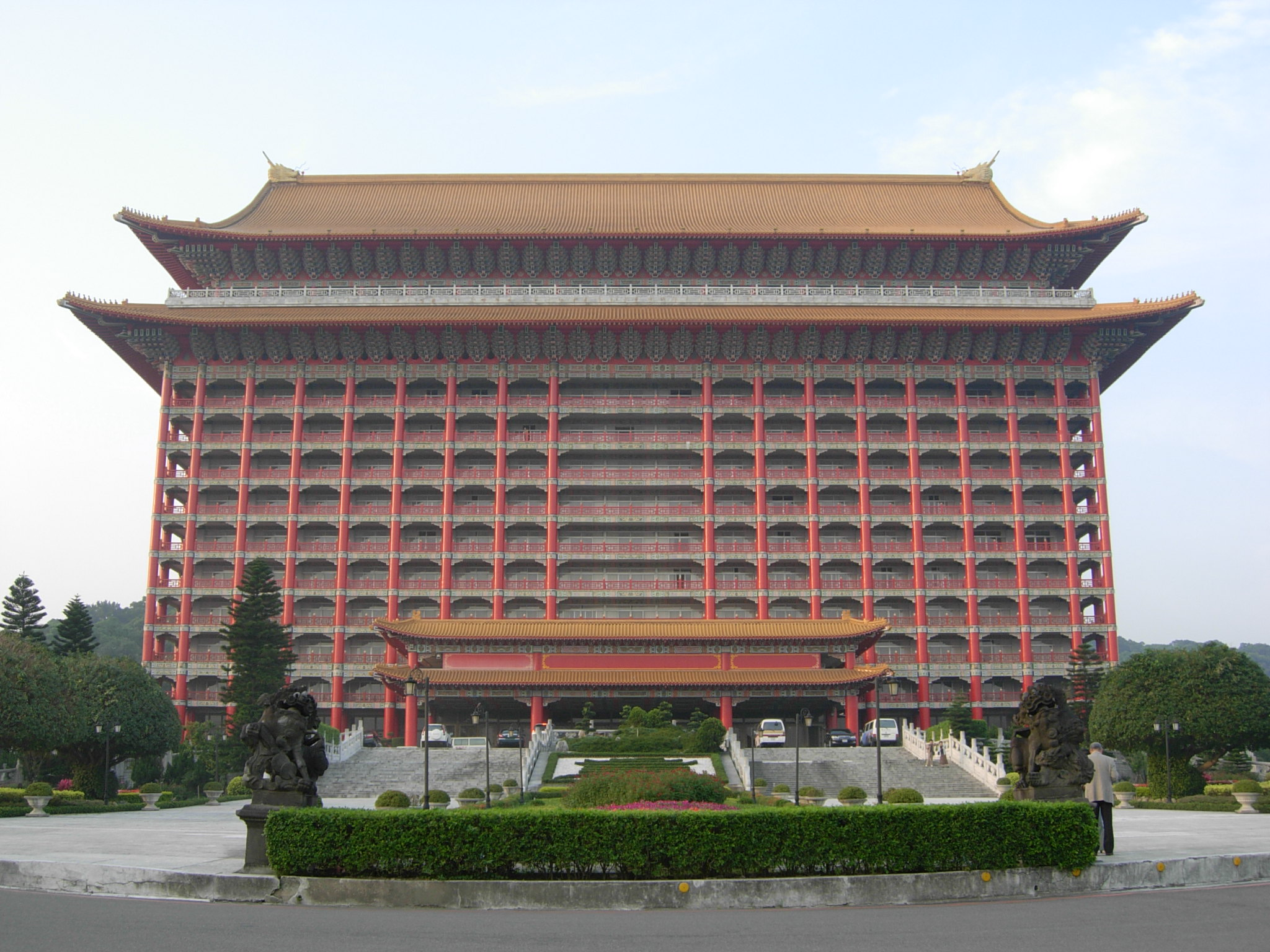
Taipei's Grand Hotel served as the Finish Line for the third season of HaMerotz LaMillion.

- Episode 33 (31 August 2013)
- First place prize: ₪1,000,000 (awarded to Talia & Koby)
- Second place prize: Two scooters (awarded to Romi & Coral)
- Third place prize: A holiday abroad (awarded to Ma'ayan & Bat-El)

Locations

- Pingsi (Jingan Suspension Bridge)
- Pingsi (Shifen Waterfall)
- Taipei (Huashan 1914 Creative Park)
- Taipei (Taipei Railway Station)
- Wulai District (Yun Hsien Resort)
- Taipei (Snake Alley Night Market)
- Taipei (Grand Hotel)

Episode summary

- At the start of this leg, teams had to choose a sky lantern at the Jingan Suspension Bridge and release it into the sky before receiving their next clue. Teams then had to use three planks to traverse a set of tightropes while facing each other, grab a flag, and then return to the start before receiving their next clue.
- After returning to Taipei, teams had to convince two locals at Huashan 1914 Creative Park to trade their parasols for sunscreen before receiving their next clue. Teams then went to the Taipei Railway Station and had to convince 10 locals to dance with them to "Gangnam Style" by following a dancing robot while the song played before receiving their next clue.
- After traveling to the Yun Hsien Resort, teams participated in tasks inspired by Skyfall. One team member had to climb onto the roof of a cablecar and retrieve a clue, which directed the other team member to descend a rope ladder below the cable car and retrieve a small satchel with a Taiwanese coin. After this, they would ride the cable car to the top of the mountain and use the coin to operate a coin-game, which gave them their next clue: a Chinese proverb in Hebrew that encouraged generosity at the Snake Alley Night Market. Teams had to figure out that they had to give spare change to a busker playing a ukulele before receiving their final clue, which directed them to the finish line: the Grand Hotel.

== Ratings ==
The third season had a 28.9% average Jewish household rating across the season.

Data courtesy of the Israeli Rating Committee, according to individuals aged 4+ from the general population.

| No. | Air date | Episode | Percentage | Nightly Rank | Ref |
|---|---|---|---|---|---|
| 25 | 7 August 2013 | "Horror Film" | 12.9% | 1 | |
| 26 | 10 August 2013 | "Leaving One of the Teams!" | 14.3% | 1 | |
| 27 | 14 August 2013 | "Secrets and Overwhelming Longing" | 10.9% | 1 | |
| 28 | 17 August 2013 | "Running in the Snow" | 13.9% | 1 | |
| 29 | 21 August 2013 | "Indian Dance" | 14.0% | 1 | |
| 30 | 24 August 2013 | "Travel Diary of the Teams" | 11.0% | 1 | |
| 31 | 28 August 2013 | "Fateful Quarterfinals" | —N/a | —N/a | |
| 32 | 29 August 2013 | "Final Elimination Before the Finals" | 14.5% | 1 | |
| 33 | 31 August 2013 | "Grand Finale!" | 20.9% | 1 | |
