= Ken Russell's unrealised projects =

During his long career, British film director Ken Russell had worked on a number of projects which never progressed beyond the pre-production stage under his direction. Some of these productions fell into development hell or were cancelled, while others were taken over and completed by other filmmakers.

== 1950s ==
=== Untitled Saint Christopher biopic ===
In 1956, well before he made a feature, Russell wanted to film a satire on the life of Saint Christopher, set in the Victorian era. However, he didn't have the financial backing from the BBC needed to make the film and settled on Knights on Bikes that year instead.

== 1960s ==
=== The Wheels of Chance ===
In 1960, Russell had proposed and written a treatment for an adaptation of H. G. Wells' short novel The Wheels of Chance. It was envisioned as both film and TV programs for the BBC, but Russell's treatment was rejected by the Head of Scripts, Donald Wilson.

=== Summer Holiday ===
Before he made his first theatrical release, Russell was given the offer of directing the musical Summer Holiday, with Cliff Richard. Russell later admitted that he regretted turning it down: "I nearly did Summer Holiday, I wish I had, my career would have changed," he said. "I would have made a good musical there's no doubt of that, and who knows what would have happened, because I don't think [Peter Yates] was a very good director." Russell would however later direct Richard in two music videos; "She's So Beautiful" and "All I Ask of You", in 1985 and 1986, respectively.

=== Vlad the Impaler ===
During the heyday of Hammer Films and the popularity of productions made on classic horror characters such as Victor Frankenstein or Count Dracula, Russell was slated to direct a film for the company on the life of Vlad the Impaler, the inspiration for the Dracula character.

=== A Clockwork Orange ===
Soon after the publication of Anthony Burgess's A Clockwork Orange, in 1964, Russell was set to direct the adaptation, which was originally projected as a vehicle for the Rolling Stones with Mick Jagger in the role of Alex. However, Burgess claimed that at the time the British Board of Censors would not approve it. Stanley Kubrick directed the film instead, with Malcolm MacDowell portraying Alex.

=== Untitled Vincent van Gogh biopic ===
In 1965, while he was making docudramas for the BBC on famous figures, Russell discussed the possibilities with Spike Milligan on making a film of the artist Vincent van Gogh with Milligan playing the role. However, Russell wanted to wait until he had the opportunity to film it in color rather than black and white.

=== Untitled Hector Berlioz biopic ===
Also in 1965, Russell professed a desire to make a film about the life of the composer Hector Berlioz, writing that the BBC's budgetary constraints would not "stretch to a film with a cast of thousands."

=== The Quest for Corvo ===
Around 1966–67, Russell worked on a proposed adaptation of A. J. A. Symons' experimental, postmodern 1934 biography of the eccentric English writer Frederick Rolfe (alias Baron Corvo) entitled The Quest for Corvo: An Experiment in Biography, to have been made in a similar style as Dante's Inferno. He intended to return to the BBC to make the film after completed post-production obligations on Billion Dollar Brain, but no meetings were held with Symons' brother Julian, who owned the rights to the story.

=== Nijinski ===
Before choosing to direct Billion Dollar Brain, Russell had a contract with producer Harry Saltzman to film the life of the Russian dancer Vaslav Nijinsky with Rudolph Nureyev in the lead. Nureyev however, refused to play the role of a dancer who he felt was inferior, and the project was called off as result.

=== The Great Twentieth Century Music Revue ===
In 1967, after shooting was completed on Nijinsky, Russell planned to return to the BBC to make a documentary film entitled The Great Twentieth Century Music Revue, for the arts showcase Omnibus, about the changing fashion of 20th-century music. He later returned to the subject and recycled ideas for 1988's ABC of British Music, made for ITV.

=== The Wishing Tree ===
In February 1968, it was announced that Russell was developing an adaptation of William Faulkner's children's story The Wishing Tree which he intended to star a seventeen-year-old Twiggy. "Paul McCartney was going to write the music and I met him to chat it over," Russell said, "but it felt like a non-starter." Though the film was not made, Russell would later work with Twiggy on his film The Boy Friend.

=== Stratchey ===
During production on Women in Love in 1968, Russell declared his interest in making an adaptation of the life of the writer and Bloomsbury Group member Lytton Strachey, based on Michael Holroyd's biography, for the BBC's Omnibus.

=== Voss ===
After being impressed by Russell's film Song of Summer, author Patrick White gave him a copy of his novel Voss, telling him he wanted to make a film of it. Russell passed the book to his collaborator John McGrath, who completed a first draft of the script by December 1970. While in production on The Boy Friend, Russell promised White that he would fly to Australia early in the new year to scout locations for Voss and then return for filming in late July 1972. Ultimately, all three parties lost interest in the project and the film was never made.

== 1970s ==
=== Under the Volcano ===
In the early 1970s, at the same time he was engaged to direct The Boy Friend, Russell was attached to film Under the Volcano starring Albert Finney, which was later made by John Huston.

=== A Handful of Dust ===
In a fall 1970 issue of Film Comment, Russell said he was interested in adapting Evelyn Waugh's A Handful of Dust, explaining that he would "not attempt to update it to the present as did the recent film of his 1928 novel Decline and Fall. Waugh's novels are relevant to the present, and they do not have to have the setting updated to prove it."

=== A Burnt-Out Case ===
In the same interview, Russell also said he would like to film A Burnt-Out Case, one of the few Graham Greene novels that had yet to be filmed.

=== Little Sparrow ===
In 1971, Russell wanted to direct a film about the life of French singer Édith Piaf, entitled Little Sparrow. This was originally to be a Warner Bros. production with the title role played by Liza Minnelli. In the end, Warner decided it was too risky financially and left the project to a French director, Guy Casaril.

=== Untitled King Ludwig II biopic ===
Also in 1971, Russell had pursued a biopic on Ludwig II, "the Mad King of Bavaria", before deciding to make Savage Messiah instead, using his own money. At the same time, Luchino Visconti went into production on a four-hour film of Ludwig, released in 1973.

=== Taverner stage adaptation ===
In 1972, shortly after working on The Devils, Russell planned to collaborate with Derek Jarman on a stage production for Covent Garden of Peter Maxwell Davies's opera Taverner, about the composer John Taverner's run-ins with England's church canon. Jarman described their vision as a "modern opera in a style which belongs to the 1970s." Designs included a cyclorama as a backdrop depicting travelers in the Gobi Desert, the roof of the opera house itself littered with dead oxen, a "William Castle-style gimmick" with seats wired to detect and amplify audience whispers, and a lowered doorway that would have forced audiences to enter the theater crawling. Covent Garden did not approve of these ideas and the production was cancelled as a result of creative differences.

=== The Angels ===
While filming commenced on Savage Messiah, Russell worked with Derek Jarman on a script called The Angels, loosely adapted from Juliette by French playwright and poet Georges Neveux, about a pop star named Poppy Day who, after suddenly disappearing in a plane crash, is resurrected by her fans into "a giant sized statue... with cripples praying for a cure as they line up to touch her golden calf." When Poppy returns after being stranded in a jungle, the fans, believing the event to be a hoax, turn into a disillusioned mob and stone her to death. MGM showed interest in the project but eventually pulled away from it, and Russell later ended up using aspects of the story for Tommy.

=== The Legend of Sarah ===
In July 1971, Barbra Streisand contacted Russell about directing her in a proposed musical biopic of Sarah Bernhardt, to have been titled The Legend of Sarah. Russell liked the idea and began to work on a screenplay while still in England, corresponded with Streisand about the project, who would have co-produced the film through her First Artists company. After the completion of the script, over time, both Streisand and Russell moved onto other projects.

=== Pantagruel: The Man with the Biggest Prick in the World ===
In spring 1973, Russell tried to film an updating of 1532's Pantagruel by François Rabelais, funded by Produzioni Europee Associati. Russell scouted the Umbrian plain for locations with an Italian crew, and enlisted Derek Jarman to be the production designer, who later listed the tasks in his memoir:

"The Russell designs included an altar with Coke bottle candelabra. There is a detail of the king's porn palace, a window made with pink marble legs and those rushed theatre curtains like a cancan dress. The notes also have precise descriptions of style, e.g., Pompadour Gimcrack. There's an avenue of monumental hammers-and-sickles, a swimming pool with a Warhol soup can lilo, a gold raft with a sail in the shape of a silver fish. The Abbey of Thelema is a ziggurat with a double spiral staircase built like Hadrian's tomb—with woods, and surmounted by a two hundred foot ornamental urn sprouting a tropical garden ... On and on, page after page. My favourites were some carriages in the form of sailing boats—sails painted with hearts, clubs, diamonds and spades."

Warner Bros. also agreed to help back the film with the help of producer Antonio Grimaldi, but the funding soon went away, and Russell later preserved some of his initial vision and ideas in the films Mahler, Tommy and Lisztomania.

=== Untitled Sergei Diaghilev biopic ===
Russell and writer Melvyn Bragg planned a film about the Russian ballet maestro Sergei Diaghilev, to be directed by Russell. Bragg's script and copious paperwork for the project were later archived in the Brotherton Library in Leeds University in 2010.

=== The Gershwin Dream ===
Before choosing Lisztomania, Russell had considered directing the biographical film The Gershwin Dream as his next project. Producer David Puttnam had commissioned music films on Gustav Mahler, Franz Liszt, Ralph Vaughan Williams and George Gershwin; the latter of which was the only one Russell did not make. He returned to the project after the release of Lisztomania, but it was abandoned soon after.

=== Superman ===
In 1975, Russell was considered to direct Superman when the film was still in its early stages of development.

=== The Space Gospel ===
In 1976, Russell again collaborated with Derek Jarman on a script, intended for Jarman to direct, titled The Space Gospel. It featured "astronauts as angels, visitors from outer space artificially inseminating Mary, and the Angel Gabriel as a projected hologram." Though it was unmade as a film, Russell later turned the concept into a science fiction novel, Mike and Gaby's Space Gospel, published in 1999.

=== Elgar, Land of Hope and Glory ===
Also in 1976, Russell wrote a film script on the life of the composer Sir Edward Elgar titled Elgar, Land of Hope and Glory, that was envisioned as a "sequel of sorts" to the film he made for Monitor. He would later make a different film on the composer in 2002 with Elgar: Fantasy of a Composer on a Bicycle.

=== The Rose ===
At the same time he was given the offer to direct Valentino, Russell was sent the script for The Rose, based on the life of singer-songwriter Janis Joplin. He called choosing Valentino over The Rose "the biggest mistake of my career."

=== Hair ===
In the mid-1970s, producer Robert Stigwood wanted Russell to direct the film version of the rock musical Hair. Instead, Miloš Forman would go on to direct.

=== Clouds of Glory: King of the Crocodiles ===
King of the Crocodiles was set to be the third in Russell's planned trilogy of the Lake Poets called Clouds of Glory for Granada Television, and focus on the poet Robert Southey. The parts which were filmed were on William Wordsworth (William and Dorothy) and Samuel Taylor Coleridge (The Rime of the Ancient Mariner).

=== Dracula ===
In 1978, a screenplay for a 1920s-set "sex-propelled", comic interpretation of Bram Stoker's Dracula was written by Russell, intending for it to star Mick Fleetwood as a reimagined version of the Count, an arts philanthropist. His screenplay was later published in 2012. According to Russell biographer Paul Sutton, the film came close to being made by Columbia Pictures, only to be abandoned after Universal greenlit its version of Dracula for production at the same time. While it was not made, it did however form the impetus for a 1996 ballet by Christopher Gable, as well as Francis Coppola's 1992 filming of the story, whose screenwriter James V. Hart was directly involved in the inception of Russell's interpretation.

== 1980s ==
=== Evita ===
In 1981, after Paramount Pictures acquired the rights to produce and finance an adaptation of the musical Evita, Russell was then hired by producer Robert Stigwood to direct the film on the basis of their collaboration on Tommy. Russell wanted to cast Liza Minnelli for the role of Eva Perón, but Stigwood and Evita lyricist Tim Rice favored Elaine Paige, who played the character in the London stage production. To convince them, Russell flew Minnelli to London, fitted her with an expensive blond wig and custom period gowns and filmed a series of celluloid tests, costing six figures. He began working on his own screenplay without seeking approval, and was ultimately fired from the production after telling Stigwood he would not do it without Minnelli. A separate script by Alan Parker later resurfaced and was made into a film in 1996 starring Madonna as Eva.

=== The Beethoven Secret ===
In 1982, Russell came close to shooting another misbegotten script The Beethoven Secret, which was to star Anthony Hopkins as Beethoven, along with Glenda Jackson and Jodie Foster as two of the composer's muses. Right when the film was to begin production, financing fell apart. Bernard Rose, a friend of Russell's, later read the copy of H. C. Robbins Landon's biography of Beethoven that Russell had used to research his planned version. As a result, Rose made Immortal Beloved, which was heavily influenced by how Russell would have made The Beethoven Secret, even hiring Peter Suschitzky who shot Lisztomania to be the director of photography.

=== Untitled Maria Callas biopic ===
Around 1982–83, Russell developed a film about Maria Callas which was to star Sophia Loren, but the project failed to get financing.

=== Cleopatra TV miniseries ===
In 1984, Russell was set to write and direct a mini-series for HBO documenting the events of the production of the 1963 film Cleopatra with Elizabeth Taylor and Richard Burton, which famously almost bankrupted 20th Century Fox. Producer Bernie Sofronski hired film scholar Brad Geagley to serve as historical consultant on the series. The project never went beyond the writing stage.

=== Untitled Percy Grainger biopic ===
In an interview, Russell told John C. Tibbetts that he once wrote a script centering on the Australian composer Percy Grainger—who had previously featured as a character in his early film Song of Summer—but "never got the money" as with many of his past projects.

=== Two-Way Romeo ===
In the mid-1980s, Russell began filming Two-Way Romeo based on Brian Aldiss' Brothers of the Head, about real-life conjoined twins Tom and Barry Howe. Russell paid £50,000 for the rights to the novel but didn't realize that Aldiss had based it on living people. Halfway into production, the film was shut down by a hold clause concerning the manager's rights to the name and story. A film adaptation of Brothers of the Head was later made in 2005, featuring some footage of Two-Way Romeo and a cameo appearance of Russell as himself.

=== Moll Flanders ===
Also in the mid-1980s, producer Bob Guccione tapped Russell to write and direct a "bold, censor-free interpretation" of Daniel Defoe's novel Moll Flanders. The budget was variously reported as being between £4-11 million, fully backed by Guccione's Penthouse magazine. They began searching England and auditioning girls with "centerfold dimensions" that required no previous stage or screen experience. When the non-union Janice Martin was settled on as the ideal Moll, the Actors' Equity Association refused to grant her participation in the production. Glenda Jackson, Oliver Reed, David Hemmings, Rod Steiger and Trevor Howard were allegedly all considered for additional roles. After England's union proved unmovable, Russell began scouting in Italy for the film's locale. As soon as he arrived to find "Italian approximations of English countrysides", Guccione sent a lawyer who proceeded to fire Russell's assistant, cameraman, editor, and costume designer. At the same time, the Actors' Equity, aware that the unknown Martin was still up for the lead, got the International Federation of Actors to impose a worldwide Moll Flanders boycott. With no location spot, no union support, legal threats, no actors officially contracted, and a script that he claimed Guccione was rewriting on the sly, Russell exited, and was later sued by Guccione who had spent over a million dollars on the project and blamed Russell for its demise. The lawsuit, which Guccione lost in 1987, was publicly televised in the documentary Your Honour, I Object!

In 2006, a failed attempt at reviving Moll Flanders with a cast of Lucinda Rhodes-Flaherty, Steven Berkoff and Barry Humphries was to be filmed in Croatia with a multi-million budget. Russell teamed up with producer Harry Alan Towers and began scouting locations, but both died before the project could be mounted.

=== St. Mawr ===
In 1987, Russell planned to direct a film of D. H. Lawrence's novella St Mawr, which he wanted to shoot in New Zealand and Australia. Ann-Margret, Glenda Jackson, and Raul Julia were to star in the adaptation. After Russell's death, Monica Tidwell was attached to film his script, albeit with some changes.

=== Revenge of the White Worm ===
After the release of The Lair of the White Worm, Russell was in talks to make a sequel with Vestron, The Revenge of the White Worm, but the idea collapsed after the company went bankrupt.

=== All-American Murder ===
After shooting was completed on The Rainbow, Russell started pre-production on All-American Murder, also for Vestron. He developed it with Crimes of Passion screenwriter Barry Sandler. Russell began auditioning actors including Jeff Goldblum and Linda Grey, but, according to Sandler, he wanted Ann-Margret. Vestron, however, was losing money, and as a result everyone working on the film received pink slips. He backed out of the film after it had been cast, and TV director Anson Williams took his place.

=== The Eleventh Commandment ===
A film about Moses was reported to be in development in 1989 with Russell directing, titled The Eleventh Commandment.

== 1990s ==
=== I Am Your Nightmare ===
In 1992, Russell was attached as director of the horror film I Am Your Nightmare, for Cannon Films. The resulting film, Night Terrors was instead directed by Tobe Hooper.

=== The Mummy Lives ===
Early on in its production, Russell was attached to direct Cannon Films' The Mummy Lives with Anthony Perkins, Amanda Donohoe and Oliver Reed in the cast. Gerry O'Hara instead directed the film, and Tony Curtis took Perkins' part after his death.

=== Untitled Alexander Scriabin biopic ===
In the mid-1990s, Russell sought backing for a project based on a screenplay he wrote about the completion of Alexander Scriabin's never-realized final work, Mysterium. After failing to secure backing, Russell instead produced a radio play The Death of Alexander Scriabin, about the composer's meeting with Aleister Crowley. Filmmaker Bernard Rose later recalled a conversation he had with Russell about the project:

"He tells me about a planned biography of Russian composer Scriabin. 'I want giant bells hanging from clouds. A couple making love on a giant bed. Of course, it's too expensive to do'."

=== Skeletons ===
In 1996, Russell was fired as director of the made-for-television film Skeletons, and David DeCoteau took over:

"on Skeletons [the producers] were having a lot of trouble, a lot of conflict, with him over the film's budget and scheduling. I think he'd lost the use of his left or right arm or something by this point too; I think he'd had a stroke so I was just like, 'Poor Ken'."

=== The House of Mirth ===
Also in 1996, John Schlesinger was set to direct Russell's screenplay adaptation of the period novel The House of Mirth by Edith Wharton. It was to star Dustin Hoffman in the lead role and be done as a co-production between Hoffman's Punch Productions and Village Roadshow. However, this iteration was not made; Terence Davies would instead go on to adapt and direct a version of the novel in 2000.

=== Son of Man ===
In December 1997, it was reported in the Variety trade papers that Russell was planning a film on the life of Christ titled Son of Man, that which would be depicted "with a lot of joy and humor". The film was to have been produced by John Daly and was expected to begin shooting in Istanbul in March the following year.

=== The Elgar Jigsaw ===
In 1999, producer Melvin Bragg approached Russell with the suggestion that he make a new film on Edward Elgar. Bragg rejected Russell's first three scripts; the first of which involved the character of a mysterious woman returning to Malvern on the first anniversary of Elgar's death, with it later being revealed that she was one of the "mysterious women" in his life. He then worked with playwright and Elgar scholar David Pownall on a new concept, which was eventually discarded as well. As Russell explained, "My next idea was to be called The Elgar Jigsaw, but we couldn't afford the props. So we finally agreed on a fourth try, the present version." For Jigsaw, Russell envisioned ambitious sequences including one in which Elgar flies a giant ear-shaped kite in the Malvern Hills. After that proved too expensive to put on film, alternatively, he conceived of one that saw Elgar and his wife pushing a baby carriage up a hill and letting it roll down.

=== Venus in Furs ===
Russell talked about filming Leopold von Sacher-Masoch's novella Venus in Furs for the bigscreen. According to widow Lisi Tribble, the project reached the script stage. She wrote on Facebook,

"Ken had a full script, typed by Bernadette Donovan, bound in one of those stationary shoppe binders that were Ken's 'style.' I read it at the house in 2000. There were phone calls about it from someone that came to naught. I think it survived the fire."

== 2000s ==
=== Neverland ===
In a 2001 interview with The Observer, Russell revealed he was asked by an American company to do a script on the creation of Peter Pan based on the J. M. Barrie biography Neverland. "It seems to write itself. [...] the script's been accepted with no changes, which is astonishing, and I believe it could happen."

=== Tesla and Katherine ===
In 2002, Russell was preparing to make a film biography of Nikola Tesla, Tesla and Katherine (alternately titled Charged: The Life of Nikola Tesla), about the romance between the inventor and the wife of Robert Underwood Johnson. Controversy soon arose when the Edison family began making public statements disproving of the way Russell planned to have Thomas Edison depicted in the film. Jim Carrey was allegedly approached as a possible lead, with Russell also considering Hugh Grant, Paul McGann, Alan Bates and David Hemmings to star. Despite enthusiasm from Belgrade's Tesla Museum and with shooting initially scheduled for June, by March 2003, government funding suddenly disappeared after the Serbian president was assassinated.

=== Bravetart Versus the Loch Ness Monster ===
In March 2006, Russell was reported to have embarked on a new film called Brave Tart Versus the Loch Ness Monster in which he was to portray the Loch Ness Monster, and his wife Lisi Tribble as the titular Brave Tart, "a saggy Scottish prostitute." The project was still being actively planned as of 2008, and in 2009, it was officially disclosed that the film would also feature "a giant, man-eating haggis and a hero called MacHaddock." Russell was opting to shoot the film close to his base in Southampton.

=== The Pearl of the Orient ===
Also in March 2006, Russell and his wife Lisi Tribble were planning to go to the Philippines in May where he was engaged to direct The Pearl of the Orient, based on the true story of a Filipino woman who tried to escape the Japanese during World War II by running into the jungle with an American missionary. In addition to directing, Russell was to play the British ambassador, with Tribble as the vicar's wife.

=== Kings X ===
In October 2006, it was reported that Russell was in pre-production on a revenge thriller Kings X, starring Emily Lloyd, Robert Carlyle, Kevin Spacey, Ray Winstone, and co-starring Twiggy. The script was written by Chris and Peter Cleverly.

== 2010s ==
=== Alice in Wonderland ===
At the time of Russell's death, it was revealed by his widow Lisi that he had secretly been working on a musical-comedy film version of Alice in Wonderland, loosely based on the 1976 adaptation of Lewis Carroll's story. Russell hoped to attract an all-star cast of his favorite actors from his career, including Roger Daltrey, who was approached to play the Mad Hatter. On December 2, it was announced that Russell's nearly finished script was expected to be made by the same team who were working with him, incorporating his ideas but under the guidance of a new director. The songs were to be written and scored by British composer Simon Boswell, whom Russell held a number of meetings with before he died. He also wanted to approach Lady Gaga and Rihanna to sing in the film. "It was in many ways a perfect Ken Russell film – raunchy and funny," Boswell said. "Alice in Wonderland is almost his perfect vehicle, with sexual freakery and religious aspects." By December 9, shooting was expected to begin early in 2012, with Renaissance Media Entertainment raising funding for the project. Kathleen Turner later alleged that Russell had wanted her for the part of the Queen of Hearts. "But he said not to worry – my court would be naked but not me," she added.

=== For the Love of Penny Whistler ===
Most recently, Russell's name was linked to a production of Jane Huxley's For the Love of Penny Whistler as co-writer/adapter alongside Ilana Rein, who would have directed. Attached to star was Howard Corlett, playing a character named Alex.

== Bibliography ==
- Lanza, Joseph (2008). Phallic Frenzy: Ken Russell and His Films. London: Aurum. ISBN 9781845133733.
