= Place Jean-Marais =

Square in Paris, France

Coordinates: 48°53′12″N 2°20′29″E

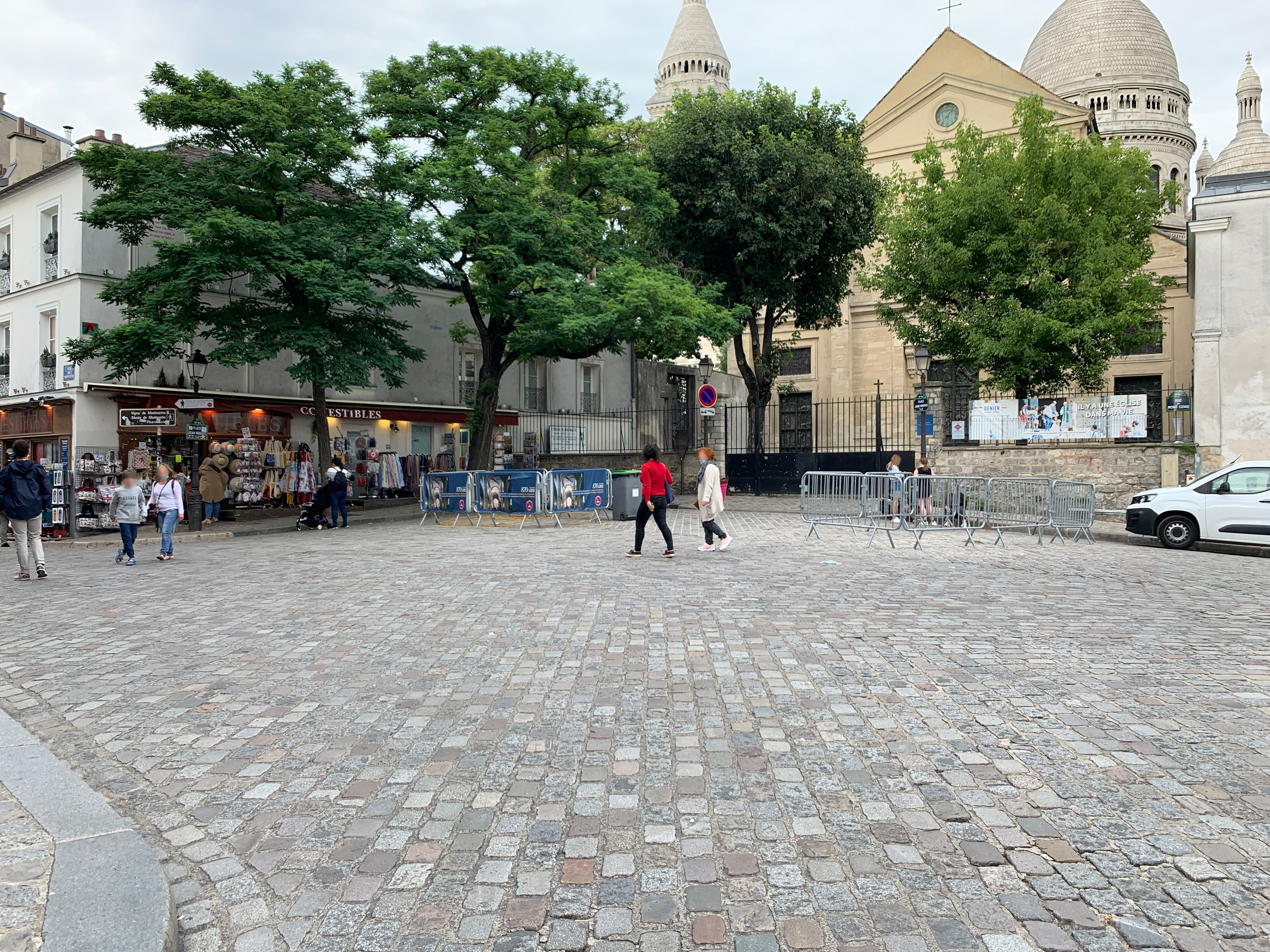

The Place Jean-Marais is a square in the 18th arrondissement of Paris, in front of Saint-Pierre de Montmartre Church, not afar from the Place du Tertre, on the top of Montmartre.

It was named after the French actor Jean Marais on 26 April 2008. It was inaugurated in the presence of Daniel Vaillant, mayor of the 18th arrondissement of Paris, Christophe Caresche, and Michou.
