= Arpoador Park =

Coordinates: 22.988117°S 43.191678°W

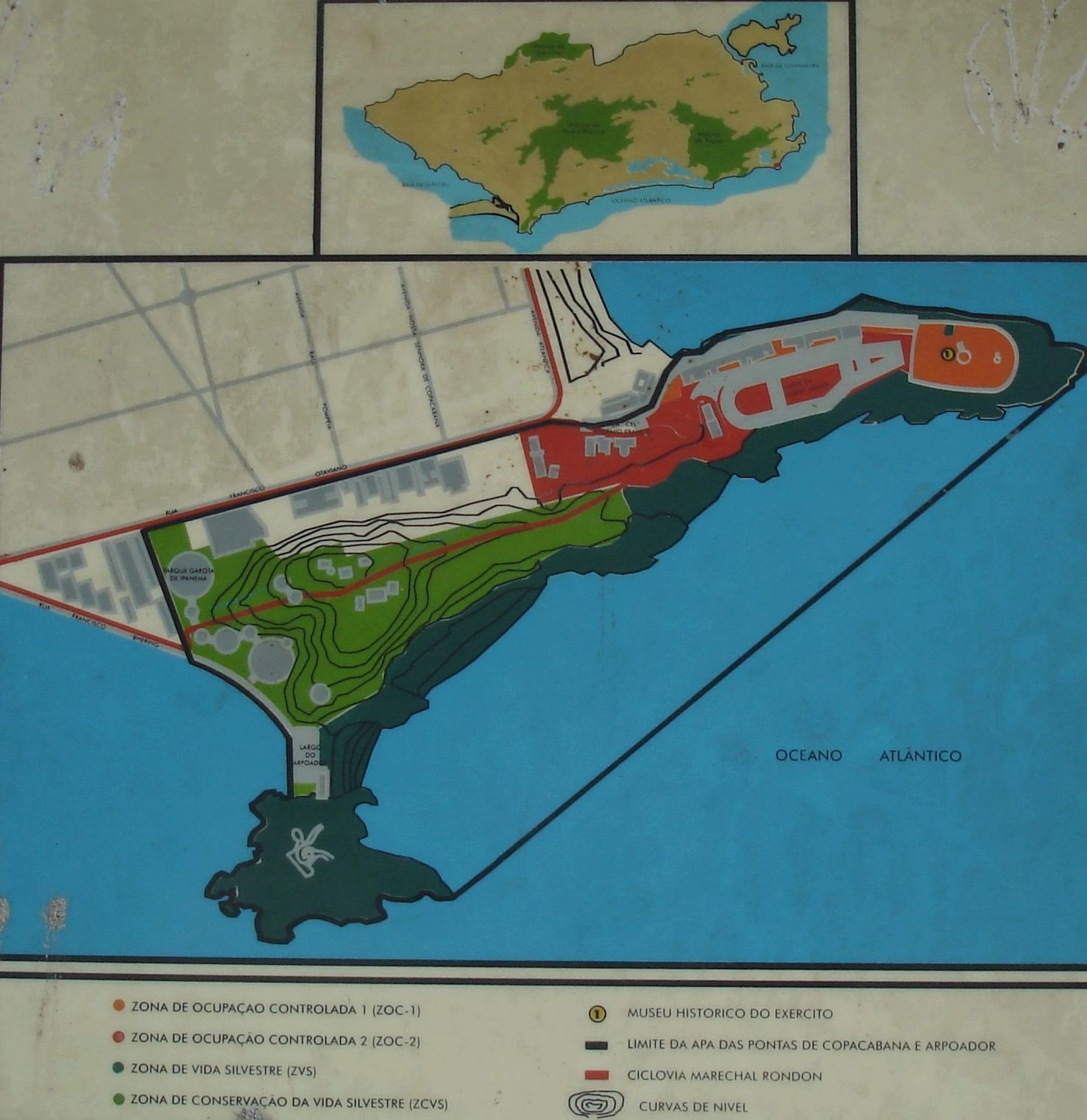
Arpoador Park map, Rio de Janeiro Brazil

The Environmental Protection Area (APA) of Copacabana and Arpoador Promontories, in Rio de Janeiro, Brazil, was created to protect its rocky coast and native plant life species.

The APA ranges from Fort Copacabana to the "Girl from Ipanema" Park.

Fort Copacabana was inaugurated in 1914 with a mission to protect the coast of Rio de Janeiro and the entrance to the harbour. Today the fort provides visitors educational and cultural activities.

In the past, at very end of Arpoador Promontory - The Arpoador Rock- fishermen used to harpoon the whales that came to reproduce in this warm waters. The harpoon used by those fishermen gave the park its name and also has been used to identify the rock (in Portuguese Arpoador means fisherman who uses harpoon). The Arpoador Rock is preserved by the Municipal Historic Heritage. Also within the APA limits there is a public square called Girl of Ipanema Park after the world-famous song composed by Vinicius de Moraes and Antônio Carlos Jobim.
