= Can-can dress =

Dresses worn during the can-can dance

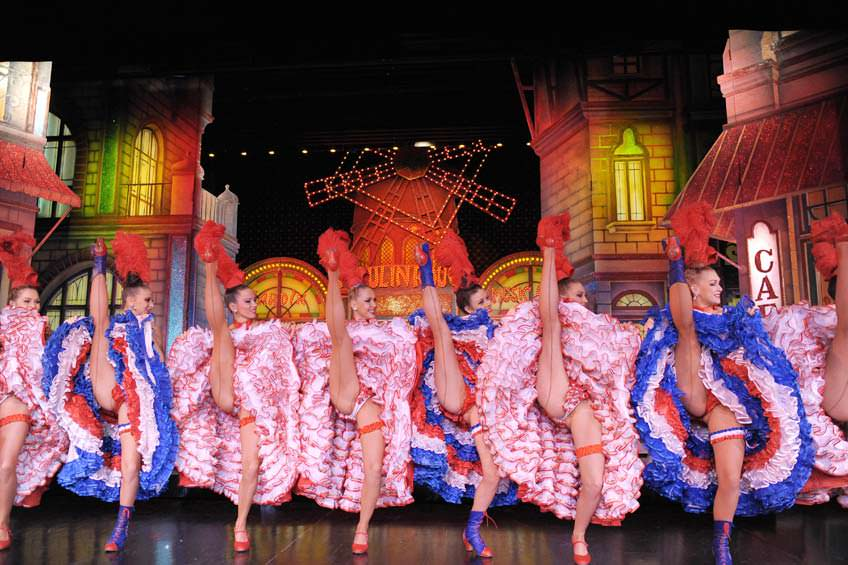

Can-Can dresses were historically worn during the can-can dance. Whilst the actual items of clothing can vary, the general style of clothing remains the same. The main idea is that the dresses should be full of frills and ruffles and be multilayered. In one interpretation, designed for a play that was set in the 1890s, the cancan dresses were "in different colours with lots of ruffles and frills on their petticoats and pantalette style underwear... fishnet stockings with ruffled garters". The cancan outfit can also be adorned with some or all of the following accessories: ankle boots, hats, gloves, capes, shawls, wraps, boas, jewelry and feathers. Traditionally, women commonly wore split knickers in their outfit.

In Celebrities' Most Wanted, a dress "not unlike a can-can dancer's dress" was described as "short and bustled in the front, flowing into a long bustled train of messy black and white fabric in the back" Contemporary versions of the cancan dress have appeared in various media. For example, in the number "Zidler's Rap (The Can-Can)" in the film Moulin Rouge, director Baz Luhrmann redesigned the can-can dresses into multi-coloured flower patterns and gave each dancer individual "personas", to make the otherwise boring dresses sexually tantalizing to modern day audiences.
