= Place du Tertre =

Square in Paris, France

Coordinates: 48°53′12″N 2°20′27″E

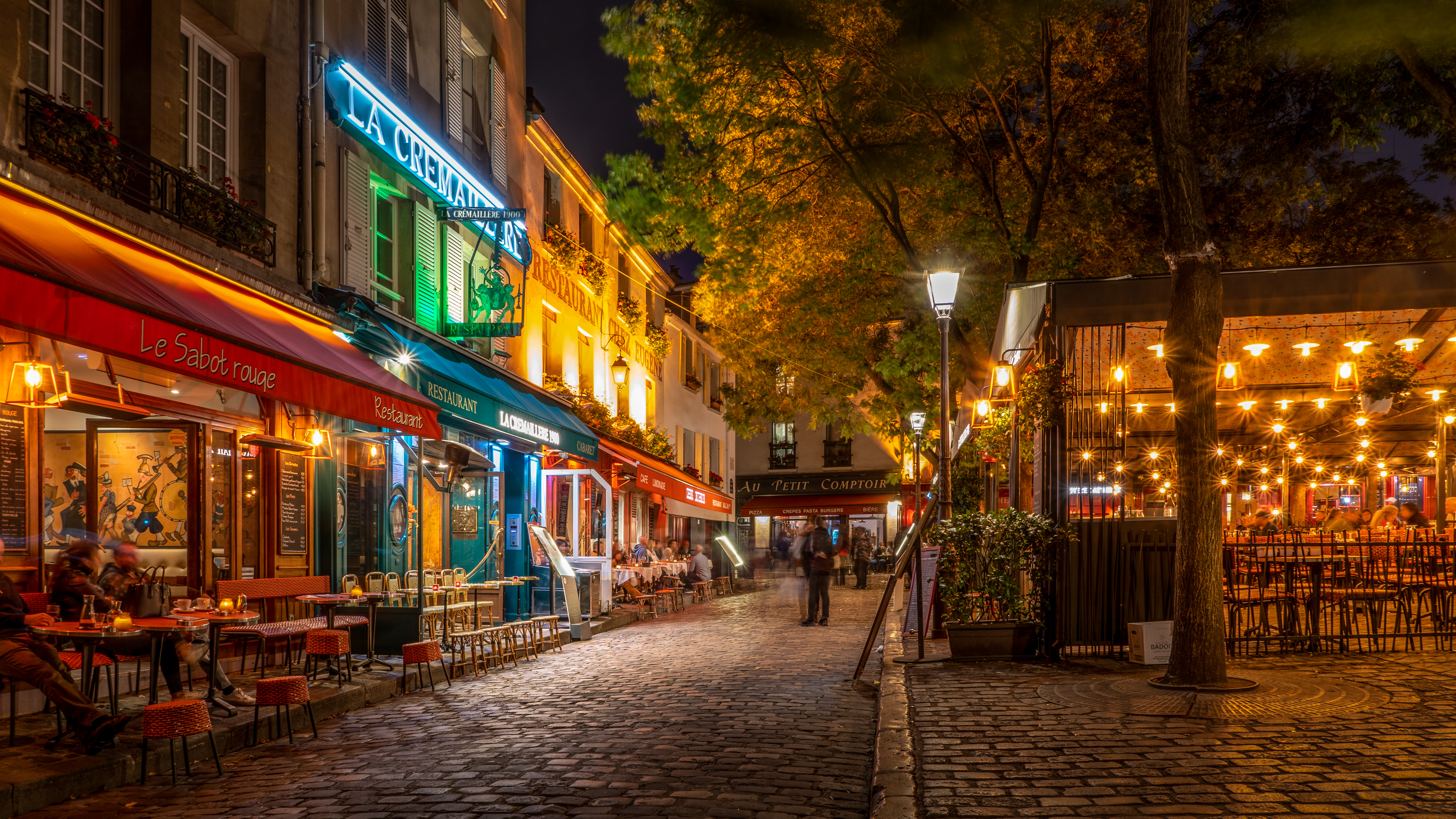
Night life at the Place du Tertre

The Place du Tertre (French pronunciation: [plas dy tɛʁtʁ]) is a square in the 18th arrondissement of Paris, France. Only a few streets away from the Basilica of the Sacré Cœur and the Lapin Agile cabaret, it is near the summit of the city's elevated Montmartre quarter.

== History ==
The Place du Tertre was the heart of the prestigious Benedictine Montmartre Abbey, established in 1133 by King Louis VI. Montmartre Abbey thrived through the centuries and until the French Revolution under the patronage of the Kings of France. The Place du Tertre was opened to the public in 1635 as Montmartre village central square. From the end of the 18th century until World War I, the whole Montmartre Bohème could be seen there: painters, songwriters and poets.

With its many artists setting up their easels each day for the tourists, the Place du Tertre is a reminder of the time when Montmartre was the mecca of modern art. At the beginning of the 20th century, many painters including Henri Matisse, Pablo Picasso, Amedeo Modigliani, and Maurice Utrillo were living there, some at the nearby Le Bateau-Lavoir. The Musée de Montmartre, the former home and studio of Pierre-Auguste Renoir and Suzanne Valadon, and the L'Espace Salvador Dalí, a museum principally dedicated to the sculpture and drawings of Salvador Dalí, can be found near Place du Tertre.

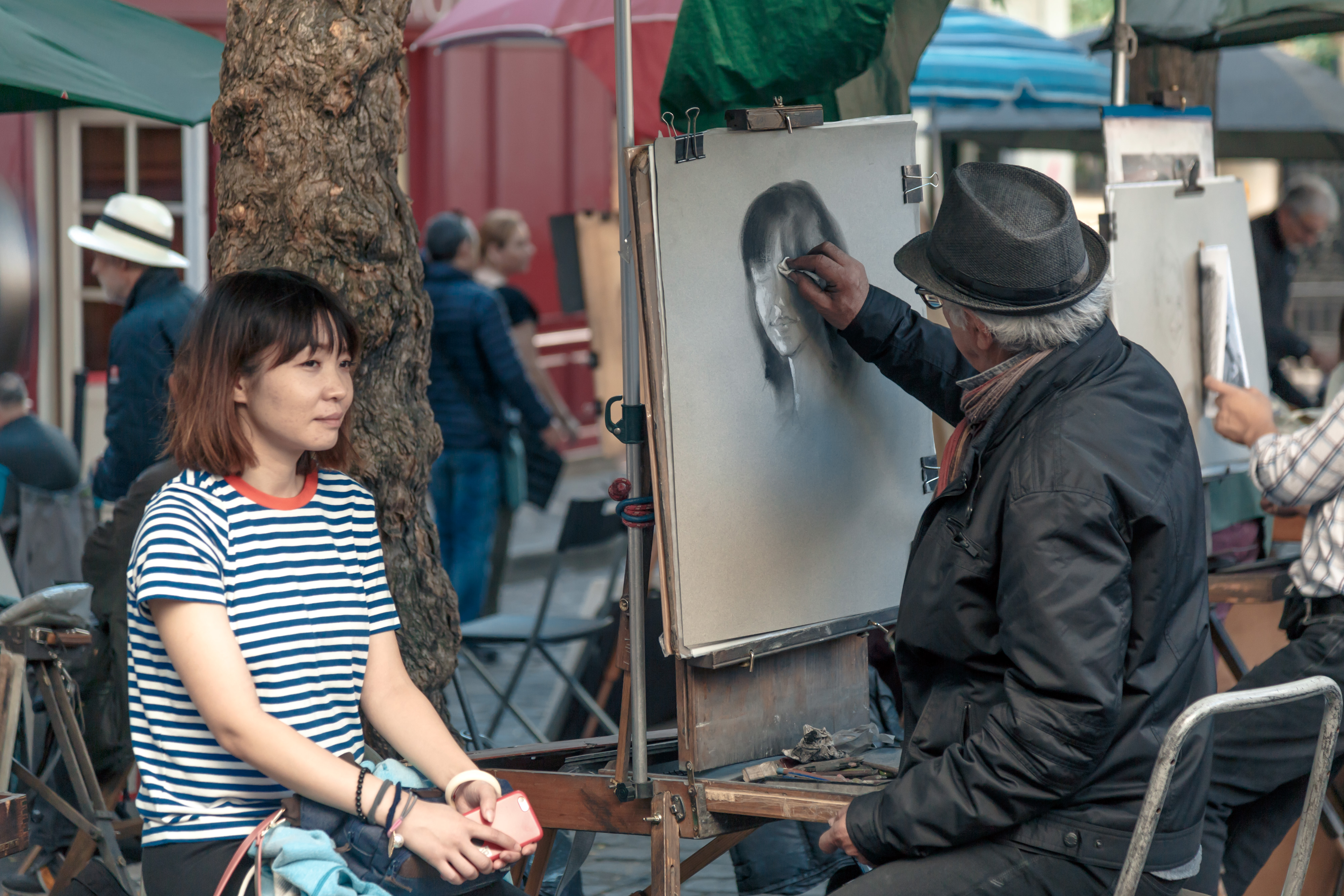
Street artist making a portrait

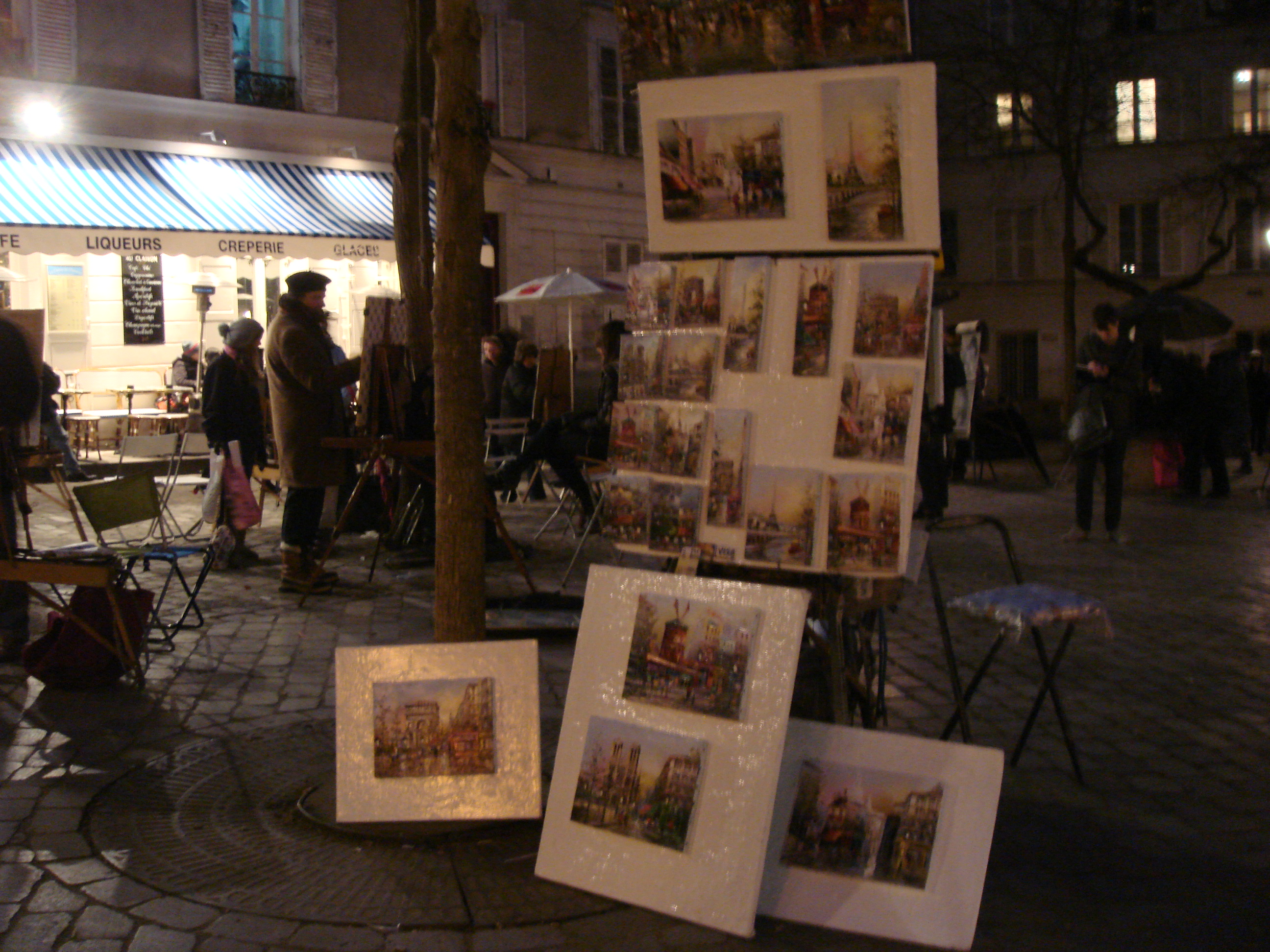
Place du Tertre, still bustling on a winter's night

Map
