= List of compositions by Arnold Bax =

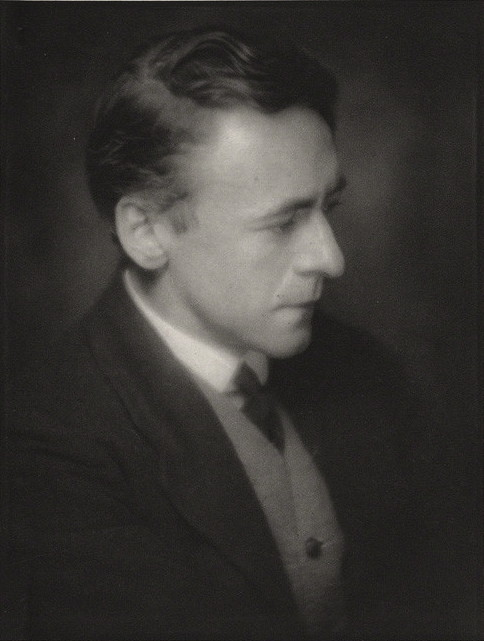
Bax in 1922

This is a list of musical compositions by English composer Sir Arnold Edward Trevor Bax, KCVO (8 November 1883 – 3 October 1953).

== Orchestral ==
=== Symphonies ===
- Symphony in F (1907, piano score; 2012–13 completed and orchestrated by Martin Yates)
- Spring Fire, Symphony for Orchestra (1913, sometimes classified as a Tone Poem)
- Symphony No. 1 (1922)
- Symphony No. 2 (1926)
- Symphony No. 3 (1929)
- Symphony No. 4 (1931)
- Symphony No. 5 (1932)
- Symphony No. 6 (1935)
- Symphony No. 7 (1939)

=== Ballets ===
- Tamara (1911, orch. 2000)
- From Dusk till Dawn (1917)
- The Truth about the Russian Dancers (1920)

=== Tone poems ===
- Cathaleen-ni-Hoolihan (1905)
- Into The Twilight (1908)
- In the Faëry Hills (1909)
- Rosc-catha (1910)
- Christmas Eve (1912, revised c.1921)
- Nympholept (1912, orch. 1915, revised 1935)
- The Garden of Fand (1913, orch. 1916)
- In Memoriam (1916)
- November Woods (1917)
- Tintagel (1917, orch. 1919)
- Summer Music (1917, orch. 1921, revised 1932)
- The Happy Forest (1922)
- The Tale the Pine Trees Knew (1931)
- Northern Ballad No. 1 (1927)
- Northern Ballad No. 2 (1934)
- Prelude for a Solemn Occasion (Northern Ballad No. 3) (1927, orch. 1933)
- A Legend (1944)

=== Concertante ===
- Symphonic Variations, for piano and orchestra (1918)
- Phantasy for Viola and Orchestra (1920)
- Winter Legends, for piano and orchestra (1930)
- Cello Concerto (1932)
- Saga Fragment, for piano and orchestra (1932)
- Violin Concerto (1938)
- Piano Concertino (1939)
- Morning Song, for piano and orchestra (1946)
- Concertante for Three Solo Wind Instruments and Orchestra (1948/1949)
- Concertante for Orchestra with Piano (Left Hand) (1949)
- Variations on the name Gabriel Fauré for Harp & String Orchestra (1949)

=== Other orchestral works ===
- Variations for Orchestra (Improvisations) (1904)
- A Song of War and Victory (1905)
- On the Sea Shore (1908, orch. 1984)
- Festival Overture (1911, revised 1918)
- Dance of Wild Irravel (1912)
- Four Orchestral Pieces (1912–13)
- Three Pieces for Small Orchestra (1913, revised 1928)
- Symphonic Scherzo (1917, revised 1933)
- Russian Suite (1919)
- Mediterranean (1922)
- Cortège (1925)
- Romantic Overture (1926)
- Overture, Elegy and Rondo (1927)
- Three Pieces (1928)
- Overture to a Picaresque Comedy (1930)
- Sinfonietta (1932)
- Saga Fragment (1932)
- Rogue's Comedy Overture (1936)
- Overture to Adventure (1936)
- London Pageant (1937)
- Paean (1938)
- Salute to Sydney (Fanfare) (1943)
- Work in Progress (Overture) (1943)
- Victory March (1945)
- The Golden Eagle (Incidental Music) (1945)
- Two Royal Wedding Fanfares (1947)
- Coronation March (1952)

== Chamber ==
=== One player ===
- Valse, for harp (1931)
- Rhapsodic Ballad, for cello (1939)

=== Two players ===
- Harp
  - Fantasy Sonata for harp and viola (1927)
  - Sonata for Flute and Harp (1928)
- Violin
  - Violin Sonata No. 0 in G minor (1901)
  - Violin Sonata No. 1 (1910)
  - Legend, for violin and piano, in one movement (1915)
  - Violin Sonata No. 2 (1915, revised 1922)
  - Ballad, for violin and piano (1916, revised 1926)
  - Violin Sonata No. 3 (1927)
  - Violin Sonata in F (1928)
- Viola
  - Concert Piece for viola and piano (1904)
  - Sonata for viola and piano (1921–1922)
  - Fantasy Sonata for harp and viola (1927)
  - Legend for viola and piano (1929)
- Cello
  - Folk-Tale, for cello and piano (1918)
  - Cello Sonata (1923)
  - Cello Sonatina (1933)
  - Legend-Sonata, for cello and piano (1943)
- Flute
  - Four Pieces for Flute and Piano (1912, revised 1915 & 1945)
  - Sonata for Flute and Harp (1928)
- Clarinet Sonata (1934)

=== Three players ===
- Trio in One Movement for Piano, Violin, and Viola (1906)
- Elegiac Trio, for flute, viola, and harp (1916)
- Piano Trio in B♭ (1946)

=== Four players ===
- String Quartet in A major (1902)
- String Quartet in E major (1903)
- String Quartet No. 1 in G major (1918)
- Piano Quartet, in one movement (1922)
- String Quartet No. 2 (1925)
- String Quartet No. 3 in F (1936)

=== Five players ===
- Cello Quintet in G (1908)
- Piano Quintet in G minor (1915)
- Quintet for Harp and Strings, in one movement (1919)
- Oboe Quintet (1922)
- Viola Quintet, in one movement (1933)

=== Six or more players ===
- In Memoriam, sextet for cor anglais, harp & string quartet (1916)
- Nonet (1930) for flute, oboe, clarinet, harp, 2 violins, viola, cello and bass
- Octet (1934) for horn, piano and string sextet
- Threnody and Scherzo, octet in two movements (1936) for Bassoon, 2 Vlns, 2 Vlas, Cello, Contrabass & Harp
- Concerto for Flute, Oboe, Harp and String Quartet (1936) - transcription of Sonata for Flute and Harp (1928)

== Piano ==
=== One piano ===
- Clavierstücke (Juvenilia) (1897–8)
- Piano Sonata, Op. 1 (1898)
- Piano Sonata in D minor (1900)
- Marcia Trionfale (1900)
- White Peace (arranged by Ronald Stevenson 1907)
- Concert Valse in E♭ (1910)
- Piano Sonata No. 1 (1910, revised 1917–20)
- Piano Sonata in F♯ minor (1910, revised, 1911, 1919 & 1921)
- Two Russian Tone-Pictures (1912)
- Nympholept (1912)
- Scherzo for Piano (1913)
- Toccata for Piano (1913)
- From the Mountains of Home (arranged by Peter Warlock) (1913)
- The Happy Forest (1914)
- In the Night (1914)
- Apple-Blossom-Time (1915)
- In a Vodka Shop (1915)
- The Maiden with the Daffodil (1915)
- A Mountain Mood (1915)
- The Princess’s Rose Garden (1915)
- Sleepy-Head (1915)
- Winter Waters (1915)
- Dream in Exile (1916)
- Nereid (1916)
- On a May Evening (1918)
- A Romance (1918)
- The Slave Girl (1919)
- What the Minstrel Told Us (1919)
- Whirligig (1919)
- Piano Sonata No. 2 (1919, revised 1920)
- Burlesque (1920)
- Ceremonial Dance (1920)
- A Country-Tune (1920)
- A Hill Tune (1920)
- Lullaby (1920)
- Mediterranean (1920)
- Serpent Dance (1920)
- Water Music (1920)
- Piano Sonata in E♭ (1921)
- Piano Sonata No. 3 (1926)
- Pæan (c.1928)
- Piano Sonata No. 4 (1932)
- A Legend (1935)
- Piano Sonata in B♭ Salzburg (1937)
- O Dame get up and bake your pies (1945)
- Suite on the Name Gabriel Fauré (1945)
- Four Pieces for Piano (1947)
- Two Lyrical Pieces for Piano (1948)

=== Two pianos ===
- Fantasia for Two Pianos (1900)
- Festival Overture (arrangement of orchestral work 1911)
- Moy Mell (1916)
- Mediterranean (arranged for three hands by H. Rich 1920)
- Hardanger (1927)
- The Poisoned Fountain (1928)
- The Devil that tempted St Anthony (1928)
- Sonata for Two Pianos (1929)
- Red Autumn (1931)

== Film music ==
- Malta, G. C. (1942)
- Oliver Twist (1948)

== Vocal ==
=== Choral ===
- Fatherland (Runeberg, tr. C. Bax) [tenor solo] (1907, revised 1934)
- A Christmas Carol (Anon.) [arranged for SATB by Hubert Dawkes] (1909)
- Enchanted Summer (Shelley) [two soprano solos] (1910)
- Variations sur ‘Cadet Rousselle’ (French trad.) [arranged by Max Saunders] (1918)
- Of a rose I sing a song (Anon.) [SATB, harp, cello, double bass] (1920)
- Now is the Time of Christymas (Anon.) [TB, flute, piano] (1921)
- Mater, ora Filium (Anon.) [SSAATTBB] (1921)
- This Worldes Joie (Anon.) [SATB with SATB divisions] (1922)
- The Boar’s Head (Anon.) [TTBB] (1923)
- I sing of a maiden that is makeless (to "I syng of a mayden", Anon.) [SAATB] (1923)
- To the Name above every Name (Crashaw) [soprano solo] (1924)
- St Patrick’s Breastplate (Anon.) [SATB] (1924)
- Walsinghame (Raleigh) (tenor, obbligato soprano) (1926)
- Lord, Thou hast told us (Washbourne) [hymn for SATB] (1930)
- The Morning Watch (Vaughan) [SATB] (1935)
- 5 Fantasies on Polish Christmas Carols (trans. Śliwiński) [unison trebles] (1942)
- 5 Greek Folksongs (trans. Michel-Dmitri Calvocoressi) [SATB] (1942)
- To Russia (Masefield) [baritone solo] (1944)
- Gloria [SATB] (1945)
- Nunc Dimittis [SATB] (1945)
- Te Deum [SATB] (1945)
- Epithalamium (Spenser) [SATB in unison] (1947)
- Magnificat [SATB] (1948)
- Happy Birthday to you (Hill) [arr. SATB] (1951)
- What is it like to be young and fair? (C. Bax) [SSAAT] (1953)

=== Songs with orchestra ===
- 2 Nocturnes [soprano] (1911)
- 3 Songs [high voice] (1914)
- Song of the Dagger (Strettell and Sylva) [bass] (1914)
- The Bard of the Dimbovitza (Strettel and Sylva) [mezzo-soprano] (1914, revised 1946)
- Glamour (O’Byrne) [high voice] (1921, orchestrated by Rodney Newton 1987)
- A Lyke-Wake (Anon.) [high voice] (1908, orchestrated 1934)
- Wild Almond (Trench) [high voice] (1924, orchestrated 1934)
- Eternity (Herrick) [high voice] (1934)
- O Dear! What can the matter be? (trad. arr. Bax) (1918)

=== Songs with chamber ensemble ===
- Aspiration (Dehmel) [arranged for high voice w/violin, cello, & piano] (1909)
- My eyes for beauty pine (Bridges) [high voice with string quartet] (c.1921)
- O Mistress mine (Shakespeare) [high voice with string quartet] (c.1921)

=== Songs with piano ===
- The Grand Match (O'Neill) (1903)
- To My Homeland (Gwynn) (1904)
- A Celtic Song Cycle (Macleod) (1904)
  - Eilidh my Fawn
  - Closing Doors
  - The Dark Eyes to Mine
  - A Celtic Lullaby
  - At the Last
- When We Are Lost (Arnold Bax) (1905)
- From the Uplands to the Sea (Morris) (1905)
- Leaves, Shadows and Dreams (Macleod) (1905)
- In the Silence of the Woods (Macleod) (1905)
- Green Branches (Macleod) (1905)
- The Fairies (Allingham) (1905)
- Golden Guendolen (Morris) (1905)
- The Song in the Twilight (Freda Bax) (1905)
- Mircath: Viking-Battle-Song (Macleod) (1905)
- A Hushing Song (Macleod) (1906)
- I Fear Thy Kisses Gentle Maiden (Shelley) (1906)
- Ballad: The Twa Corbies [recitation with piano] ('Border Minstrelsy') (1906)
- Magnificat (St. Luke 1.46-55) (1906)
- The Blessed Damozel (Rossetti) (1906)
- 5 Traditional Songs of France (1920)
- I Heard a Piper Piping (Seosamh MacCathmhaoil, Joseph Campbell) (1922)
