= The Secret Life of Arnold Bax =

1992 British TV movie

The Secret Life of Arnold Bax is a 1992 British TV movie directed by Ken Russell, who also stars in the title role as composer Arnold Bax. It was one of eight musical drama documentaries directed by Russell for The South Bank Show on London Weekend Television between 1983 and 2002. The film focuses on the composer's complicated relationship with pianist Harriet Cohen (played by Glenda Jackson) while at the same time seeking inspiration for his music from the dancer Annie. As with all of Russell's films on composers the drama serves as a showcase for the music. Set in 1948, when the film Oliver Twist (with music by Bax) had just been released, the film mostly uses earlier compositions such as The Garden of Fand, Tintagel and the Symphony No 2 as its soundtrack. Lewis Foreman was musical adviser.

Ken Russell fell in love with Hetty Baynes during filming, and she became his wife from 1992 until 1999. Glenda Jackson appeared in her last acting role before becoming a Member of Parliament.

== Cast ==
- Ken Russell as Arnold Bax
- Glenda Jackson as Harriet Cohen
- Hetty Baynes as Annie
- Melissa Docker as Sybil Chadwick
- Kenneth Colley as John Ireland
