= Piano Sonata in E-flat (Bax) =

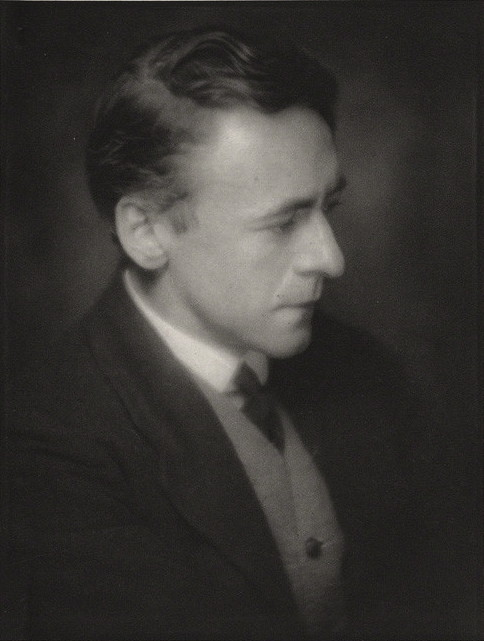
Arnold Bax in 1922

Arnold Bax composed his Piano Sonata in E♭ major in 1921. It is the original version of Bax's First Symphony and was not performed in public or published in the composer's lifetime.

== Movements ==
The sonata is in three movements and lasts approximately 35 minutes.

1. Allegro moderato e feroce — molto cantabile
2. Lento con molto espressione
3. Scherzo — Finale (Largamente — Allegro molto vivace)

In the first movement, the fortissimo opening motif and a stamping theme which follows a few bars later was called by one commentator "a Promethean fist" shaking at heaven; both these musical features are used continually in this and the third movement, with the opening motif elaborated into the first subject proper upon its restatement. Bax biographer and authority Lewis Foreman writes, "A rhythmic figure drives the music until the mood becomes calmer and soon the second subject tune appears which Bax asks to be played 'clear and sweet' and followed by a pendant 'warm and flowing.'" This episode is only an interlude before the development which the composer says "seems to express more emphatically the idea of strife." Foreman continues, "The rhythmic idea which followed the second subject returns and drives the music on over a great span of frenetic action. Eventually in music of great calm the second subject returns.... [T]he end comes with a return of fast-running music and a marching statement of the first theme."

The mood for the second movement is set with flowing arpeggios over which a romantic wide-spanning theme is floated. Textures such as these proliferate, contrasting strongly with the outer movements. A continually repeated falling figure acts as an accompaniment, giving an overall impression of stillness. At the marking Molto tranquillo, this figure shifts to the right hand and the theme to the left hand. The music climaxes with frenetic arpeggios in the right hand as the bass slips lower down the keyboard and the main theme is grandly sounded in chords written over four staves. The music dies away with the return of the repeated figure.

Foreman writes

The opening theme of the first movement returns to launch the third, now more exultantly, after which scherzando figures dart over the keyboard and the main theme rushes up energetically from the bass. It is followed by the reappearance of the secondary first subject theme from the first movement. The second subject idea Bax described as "freakish, almost grotesque." These are now worked extensively, with the opening theme in chords returning at one point as (Bax put it) to "what corresponds roughly to a trio section." The music comes to a climax with the kind of triumphal march on a new version of the opening theme. "This persists," Bax said, "to the end with ever increasing force and breadth of design."

== Overview ==
Between April and June 1921, Bax wrote what was intended to be his Third Piano Sonata, placing that title at the head of the manuscript. Bax subsequently played the work, which Foreman called in the New Grove "fiercely new, and still romantic in impulse," for pianists Arthur Alexander and Harriet Cohen. Alexander had premiered the Second Piano Sontata, while Cohen had championed the revised version of the same work. Cohen remembered that when they heard this new piece, both pianists immediately realized that what Bax had written was not a sonata but a symphony; orchestrated in like manner to the composer's tone poems, it would indeed be an epic work. Bax agreed with them and began orchestrating the work. Finding the central movement overly pianistic for such treatment and uncomfortable with its tone of romantic nostalgia, Bax chose to replace it with a darker elegy in memory of the Easter Rising and its aftermath.

After the symphony had been premiered in December 1922, the E-flat Sonata was forgotten and inaccessible until Cohen donated Bax's manuscripts to the British Library following his death. However, once the work was microfilmed and made available for study, interest began to grow in hearing it performed. Pianist and composer Patrick Piggott copied out the central movement as a separate work, and pianist John Simons was coaxed out of retirement to make a recording of the complete sonata, which was issued on cassette in 1982. Pianist Noemy Belinkaya gave the first public performance of the sonata for the Bax centenary in October 1983. In addition to Belinkaya, Simons and Piggott, several editors have worked on the manuscript, including Lewis Foreman, Graham Parlett, and Paul Hindenmarsh. A number of additional editorial points were made by composer and pianist John McCabe, which were included on McCabe's recording of the work for Continuum Records.
