= The Happy Forest =

Symphonic poem

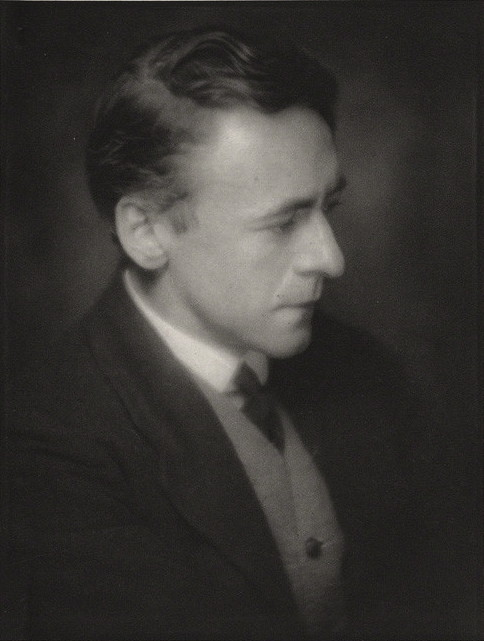
Arnold Bax in 1922

The Happy Forest is a symphonic poem by Arnold Bax. It was composed as a piano piece in 1914, and orchestrated in 1922. The inspiration for the work was a story of the same name by Herbert Farjeon, a rural idyll with mythical figures delighting the observer. Bax's treatment is an evocation of the mood of the story rather than a programmatic depiction of the incidents.

== History ==
Bax's brother Clifford was editor of a quarterly magazine, Orpheus, to which the author Herbert Farjeon, better known as a writer of revue sketches and light verse, contributed. Farjeon's short story – he called it a "prose-poem" – "The Happy Forest", was described as a "Nature Poem" and depicted an idyllic rustic scene populated by galant shepherds and a satyr. It inspired Bax to compose a piano piece with the same title. Completed in May 1914, it was dedicated to Farjeon.

After the First World War, Bax orchestrated the piece. His biographer Lewis Foreman comments that neither the serene rural scene nor the music Bax wrote for it could have been conceived after the collective experience of the war, and that Bax, in orchestrating the piece was "revisiting a world beyond recall". The orchestral version was dedicated to and first conducted by Eugene Goossens. The premiere was given at the Queen's Hall in London on 3 July 1923. The piece was given by Sir Henry Wood at the Proms in 1925.

== Structure ==
The opening is marked "Vivacious and fantastic", and features muted horns and harp, playing at a moderate tempo at first, but the music quickly gathers momentum. It takes the form of a scherzo and trio, the lyricism of the latter contrasting with the ebullience of the outer sections. The critic in The Manchester Guardian commented that the score was "so packed with interesting detail that the effect of the whole is at first apt to escape the listener." The Times observed that the piece is "an affair of colour and movement, yet it is no ordinary spring idyll, but something fantastic … an appropriate setting for a German fairy tale in which the trees are alive and anything might happen". Although the score has many programmatic touches relating to Farjeon's text, Foreman writes that enjoyment of the piece does not require any knowledge of them by the listener. The work is primarily an evocation of the mood of the story rather than a programmatic representation of the plot.

== Recordings ==
The Happy Forest was not recorded in the composer's lifetime. The first recording was made for RCA Victor by the London Symphony Orchestra, conducted by Edward Downes, in 1969. The Bax discography, compiled by Graham Parlett, has details of four subsequent recordings.
