= Irene Scharrer =

English classical pianist

- Born: 2 February 1888; London, UK
- Died: 11 January 1971 (aged 82)
- Occupation: Pianist
- Spouse: Samuel Gurney Lubbock
- Children: 2, including Rachel Gurney

Irene Scharrer (2 February 1888 – 11 January 1971) was an English classical pianist.

== Early life and education ==
Irene Scharrer was born in London, the daughter of Herbert Tobias Scharrer and Ida Henrietta Samuel Scharrer. She studied at the Royal Academy of Music with Tobias Matthay. Scharrer was a descendant of Moses Samuel, she being his great-granddaughter. The pianist Harriet Cohen was the great-great-granddaughter of Samuel, thus making the two pianists related. Irene’s mother, Ida, was a friend of Lizzie Hess, the mother of Myra Hess, and both daughters attended St Leonard’s School for Girls. The Scharrers and Hesses were not related and Irene and Myra were not cousins, as many people believed. They both studied at the Royal Academy of Music where they were quite inseparable. The composer Arnold Bax describing them as, ‘two very small and eternally giggling girls’.

== Career ==
Scharrer made her London début at the age of 16, and gave concerts regularly until June 1958, where she appeared for the last time, playing Mozart's Sonata for Two Pianos with Myra Hess. They often performed four-handed compositions together. "Her playing is virile, yet withal delicate and poetic," explained a 1912 reviewer, "a lovely touch and poetic style combined with warmth of tone, but pervading all delicacy and refinement." She was especially known for playing the works of Chopin.

Other collaborators included Arthur Nikisch in Berlin, Hungarian violinist Louis Pécskai, and Landon Ronald in London. She visited Sir Edward Elgar in 1918 and was promised the first performance of his piano concerto, then being sketched. Scharrer gave her first American concerts in 1926, in Boston and New York. She gave a radio concert in 1929.

== Recordings ==
A selection of reissues is commercially available.

From as early as 1909 she recorded for His Master's Voice, then between 1929 and the mid-1930s for Columbia. Recorded repertoire included:

- Bach Prelude and Fugue (His Master's Voice D576)
- Chopin Prelude in F-sharp minor; Waltz in E minor (His Master's Voice E255); Fantaisie-Impromptu; Impromptu in A-flat (His Master's Voice D1087); Study in G-flat (His Master's Voice D1303); Study in F minor Op. 25 No. 2
- Saint-Saëns Allegro Scherzando from Piano Concerto in G (His Master's Voice D81)
- Schumann Intermezzo in E-flat (His Master's Voice D87)
- Mendelssohn Rondo Capricioso (His Master's Voice D87); The Bees' Wedding (His Master's Voice D1303)
- Sinding Rustle of Spring (His Master's Voice D1303)
- Debussy Poissons d'or; Reflets dans l'eau (His Master's Voice D914); Arabesque No. 2 (His Master's Voice D576)
- Chopin Scherz No.2 in B Flat Minor, Op. 31 (Columbia D.X. 433)
- Chopin Fantaisie Impromptu / Impromptu in A Flat (His Master's Voice D1087)
- Liszt Rhapsody (His Master's Voice 05526)

== Personal life ==
Scharrer married Samuel Gurney Lubbock, who was a housemaster at Eton College. They had two children, both actors, Ian Lubbock and Rachel Gurney. She died January 11, 1971, at the age of 82.
