= I Remember Nelson =

- Genre: Historical drama
- Written by: Hugh Whitemore
- Directed by: Simon Langton
- Starring: Kenneth Colley; Geraldine James; Tim Pigott-Smith; John Clements
- Composer: Patrick Gowers
- Country of origin: United Kingdom
- Original language: English
- No. of series: 1
- No. of episodes: 4

Production
- Producer: Cecil Clarke
- Running time: 60 minutes
- Production company: Central Television

Original release
- Network: ITV
- Release: 21 February – 18 April 1982

I Remember Nelson is a British historical drama television series portraying the relationship between Horatio Nelson, 1st Viscount Nelson and Emma Hamilton in the period leading up the Battle of Trafalgar. It first aired in four parts on ITV between 21 February and 18 April 1982.

== Selected cast ==
- Kenneth Colley as Vice-Adm. Horatio Viscount Nelson
- Tim Pigott-Smith as Capt. Thomas Hardy
- Geraldine James as Lady Emma Hamilton
- John Clements as Sir William Hamilton
- Michael Harbour as Captain Blackwood
- Raf Vallone as Caracciolo
- Paolo Bonacelli as King Ferdinando
- Harriet Reynolds as Queen Maria Carolina
- Vernon Dobtcheff as Cardinal Ruffo
- Peter Clapham as Diplomat
- Una Brandon-Jones as Nurse
- Tina Ruta as Emma's Maid
- Phil Daniels as William Blackie
- Anna Massey as Lady Frances Nelson
- Daniel Massey as William Beckford
- Ken Kitson as Mangan
- Laurence Naismith as Rev. Edmund Nelson
- Sylvester Morand as Lord Byron
- John Forbes-Robertson as Lord Spencer
- Mike Edmonds as Pirate

== Bibliography ==
- Sue Parrill. Nelson's Navy in Fiction and Film: Depictions of British Sea Power in the Napoleonic Era. McFarland, 2009.
