= Moses Samuel =

English writer, watchmaker and translator (1795–1860)

- Born: 1795; London, England
- Died: 17 April 1860 (aged 64–65); Liverpool, England
- Occupations: Writer; watchmaker; translator
- Notable work: Original translator of the Book of Jasher (Venice, 1625)
- Spouse: Harriet Samuel (m. 1821; died 1843)
- Children: 5
- Relatives: Samuel Montagu, 1st Baron Swaythling (nephew); Sir Stuart Montagu Samuel, 1st Baronet (great-nephew); Herbert Samuel, 1st Viscount Samuel (great-nephew); Irene Scharrer (great-granddaughter); Harriet Cohen (great-great-granddaughter)

Moses Samuel (1795 – 17 April 1860) was an English writer, watchmaker, translator and authority on rabbinical literature.

== Early life ==
Samuel was born in 1795 to Polish–Jewish parents in London. His father, Emanuel Menachem Samuel (c. 1755–c. 1800), immigrated to London around 1775 from Kempen, Silesia (present-day Poland) whilst his mother, Hanna Samuel (née Hinde; 1752–1822), arrived in London around 1793. (Note: Also cited as Hannah.) The third of four siblings, Samuel was the younger brother of Nathan Meyer Samuel (c. 1775–1835), a naval agent and pawnbroker, and Louis Samuel (1794–1859), a watchmaker and silversmith.

In 1805, Samuel and his mother (Note: Neither Wasserstein or Hart mentions if his younger sister, Frances, joined them.) moved to Liverpool where his two elder brother had already settled.

== Career ==
He went into business, not with any great success, but founding what later became the H. Samuel chain. He was the originally anonymous translator of the Italian Jewish kabbalah text Book of Jasher (Venice, 1625), which later became a para-canonical text in the Church of Jesus Christ of Latter-day Saints. He later wrote "I did not put my name to it as my Patron and myself differed about its authenticity". The patron was Mordecai Noah, the New York publisher, who purchased the text after the Royal Asiatic Society declined it.

He also translated works of Moses Mendelssohn (notably Jerusalem, London, 1838) into English. An orthodox Jew, he campaigned against both the Reform Jewish movement, and as author of An Address to the Missionaries of Great Britain against Christian efforts to proselytise Jews. He co-edited The Cup of Salvation - Kos Yeshuot, a magazine in Hebrew and English, with D. M. Isaacs.

== Personal life ==
On 12 September 1821, Samuel married Harriet Samuel (née Israel; 1793–1843) at Hambro' Synagogue in London. The couple had two daughters and three sons. On 17 April 1860, Samuel died in Liverpool and was buried at Liverpool Jewish Cemetery.

The great-great-grandfather of the pianist Harriet Cohen and the soprano, broadcaster and educator Myra Verney (1905–1993), Samuel's was the great-grandfather of the pianist Irene Scharrer. Through his brother Louis, Samuel was the uncle of Samuel Montagu, 1st Baron Swaythling and the great-uncle of Sir Stuart Montagu Samuel, 1st Baronet and Herbert Samuel, 1st Viscount Samuel.
