= November Woods =

Poem by Arnold Bax

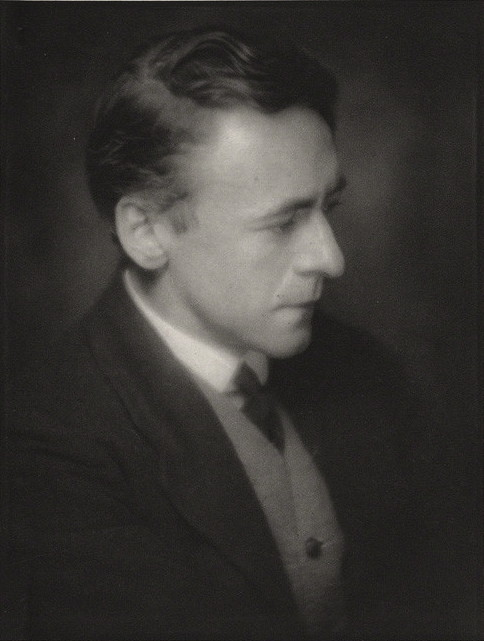
Arnold Bax in 1922

November Woods is a tone poem by Arnold Bax, written in 1917. Ostensibly a musical depiction of nature, the work conveys something of the composer's turbulent emotional state arising from the disintegration of his marriage and his love affair with the pianist Harriet Cohen. According to the composer, the piece is not programmatic, but evokes mood rather than painting a picture or telling a story.

== History ==
The work was completed in November 1917, and received its first performance in Manchester, on 18 November 1920, given by the Hallé Orchestra conducted by Hamilton Harty. In The Manchester Guardian, Samuel Langford remarked on the "grandeur and singleness of conception" of the piece; he noted the influence of Wagner, but felt that the piece lacked the primeval sense of Wagner's music and instead had an appeal that was "intensely human". The work was given the following month at a Royal Philharmonic Society concert at the Queen's Hall, conducted by Harty. The anonymous critic in The Times wrote, "The whole thing impressed us by a skilful and rather stagey picture of 'the woods so wild' and rather too drawn out for the actual value of its musical ideas."

== Structure ==
November Woods, like several other symphonic poems by Bax, is inspired by nature. The composer disavowed any programmatic content, declaring that the work "may be taken as an impression of the dank and stormy music of nature in the late autumn, but the whole piece and its origins are connected with certain rather troublous experiences I was going through myself at the time....". The experiences to which he alluded were connected with the break-up of his marriage and his love affair with the pianist Harriet Cohen. The untroubled second theme of the work may, according to the commentator Keith Anderson, suggest more tranquil feelings of earlier days.

In the earlier years of his career, Bax was given to writing for very large orchestral forces. November Woods calls for three flutes; piccolo; two oboes; cor anglais; three clarinets, one bass clarinet; two bassoons, one contrabassoon; four horns; three trumpets; three trombones; one tuba; two harps; timpani; cymbals; bass drum; glockenspiel; celeste; and strings. The analyst John Palmer comments that despite the large forces, Bax's orchestration is among the most subtle in his entire oeuvre: "In the opening moments, quivering woodwinds, harps, and muted strings present a delicately shifting array of colors". Palmer draws attention to instrumental combinations, such as oboe doubling cello and viola playing with bassoon and cor anglais.

After an opening that evokes a strong breeze, with harp glissandi and a swift and agile woodwind theme, a muted solo cello moves the melodic content forward. The main theme, a descending, chromatic, three-note figure, dominates the first part of the work, which is developed before the second subject, an andante con moto, in which harp and celeste add colour to a theme played by cor anglais, bassoon and viola. A central section, with pianissimo strings and high horns precedes a brief sonata form development and recapitulation. After a sonorous climax the music returns to the opening key of G minor and the work ends with the bass clarinet fading to a quiet finish.

The work plays for about 16–17 minutes.

== Recordings ==
November Woods was not recorded in the composer's lifetime. The first recording was made for Lyrita Recorded Edition by the London Philharmonic Orchestra, conducted by Sir Adrian Boult in November 1967. The Bax discography, compiled by Graham Parlett, has details of six subsequent recordings.
