= In the Faëry Hills =

Composition by Arnold Bax

In the Faëry Hills, to which the composer gave the alternative Irish title An Suagh Sidhe, is a symphonic poem by Arnold Bax. It was composed in 1909 and was premiered in London in 1910. It is the second of three works that make up a trilogy of symphonic poems with the collective title Eire. The inspiration for the piece was The Wanderings of Oisin by the poet W. B. Yeats, whom Bax greatly admired.

== Background ==
From his time as a student at the Royal Academy of Music between 1900 and 1905 Bax was greatly attracted to Ireland and Celtic folklore. In the years after leaving the academy he wrote a trilogy of symphonic poems under the collective title of Eire. In the Faëry Hills was the second of the three, following Into the Twilight (1908) and preceding Roscatha (1910). It was more popular than the other two, and was the only one of the three to be published in Bax's lifetime. The work was commissioned by Henry Wood at the suggestion of Sir Edward Elgar, whom Bax had first met in 1901.

Bax wrote of the origin of the piece, "I got this mood under Mount Brandon with all W B [Yeats]'s magic about me – no credit to me of course because I was possessed by Kerry's self". He wrote in a programme note for the work that he had sought "to suggest the revelries of the 'Hidden People' in the inmost deeps and hollow hills of Ireland".

The literary basis for the piece is Yeats's collection The Wanderings of Oisin. The fairy princess Niamh falls in love with the Irish hero, Oisín and his poetry, and persuades him to join her in the immortal islands. He sings to the immortals what he conceives to be a song of joy, but his audience finds mere earthly joy intolerable:

But when I sang of human joy
A sorrow wrapped each merry face,
And, Patrick! by your beard, they wept,
Until one came, a tearful boy;
"A sadder creature never stept
Than this strange human bard," he cried;
And caught the silver harp away,
And, weeping over the white strings, hurled
It down in a leaf-hid, hollow place
That kept dim waters from the sky;
And each one said, with a long, long sigh,
"O saddest harp in all the world,
Sleep there till the moon and the stars die!"

The immortals sweep Oisín into "a wild and sudden dance" that "mocked at Time and Fate and Chance".

Bax does not attempt a programmatic depiction of the episode, but seeks to convey something of the atmosphere of the poem; he said that he had tried "to envelop the music in an atmosphere of mystery and remoteness akin to the feeling with which the people of the West think of their beautiful and often terrible faeries". The central section has been seen by the commentators Lewis Foreman and Marshall Walker as inspired by the moment when Oisín is caught up by the immortals in their wild dance.

The work is the longest of the three constituent parts of Eire, playing for approximately 15 minutes, compared with about 13 for Into the Twilight (1908) and 11 for Roscatha.

== Instrumentation ==
The piece is scored for three flutes (third doubling on piccolo), two oboes, English horn, three clarinets, bass clarinet, two bassoons, four horns, three trumpets, three trombones, tuba, timpani, bass drum, cymbals, glockenspiel, tambourine, celesta, two harps, and strings.

== Performance, reception and recordings ==
The premiere of the work was conducted by Wood at a Promenade Concert at the Queen's Hall on 30 August 1910. The work received mixed notices. The Manchester Guardian's reviewer wrote, "Mr Bax has happily suggested the appropriate atmosphere of mystery"; The Observer found the piece "very undeterminate and unsatisfying, but not difficult to follow". The Times commented on the "rather second-hand language" at some points, derivative of Wagner and Debussy, although "there is still a great deal which is wholly individual". The Musical Times praised "a mystic glamour that could not fail to be felt by the listener" although the coherence of the piece "was not instantly discernible".

The work has, as of 2015, been recorded three times for CD, by the Ulster Orchestra conducted by Bryden Thomson (1985), the Royal Scottish National Orchestra and David Lloyd-Jones (1997), and the BBC Philharmonic Orchestra and Vernon Handley (2006).

== Sources ==
- Foreman, Lewis (January 1971). "The Musical Development of Arnold Bax". Music & Letters. 52 (1): 59–68. doi:10.1093/ml/LII.1.59. JSTOR 731834. (subscription required)
- Parlett, Graham (1999). A Catalogue of the Works of Sir Arnold Bax. Oxford: Clarendon Press. ISBN 978-0-19-816586-6.
- Scott-Sutherland, Colin (1973). Arnold Bax. London: J M Dent. ISBN 978-0-460-03861-4.
