= Overture to a Picaresque Comedy =

Concert overture by Arnold Bax

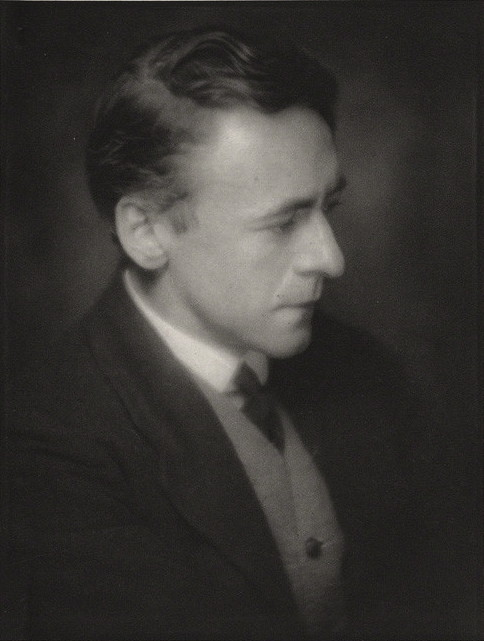
Arnold Bax in 1922

The Overture to a Picaresque Comedy is a concert overture composed by Arnold Bax in 1930. It was premiered by the Hallé Orchestra conducted by the dedicatee, Sir Hamilton Harty, in November 1931. The work is untypical of its composer, who was not usually associated with comedy in music.

== Background ==
Bax was generally associated with music that the 1955 reference work The Record Guide called "intrinsically noble, humane, and capable of a certain melancholy grandeur". In his youth, Bax had been greatly taken with the works of Richard Strauss, before his enthusiasm was diverted to a fascination with Celtic culture. When Sir Hamilton Harty approached him in 1930 to write a short overture for the Hallé Orchestra, Bax promised him "Straussian pastiche", and produced what the composer's biographer, Lewis Foreman calls "this memorable and high-spirited score complete with lapses into waltz time."

The word "picaresque" is defined by the Oxford English Dictionary as designating "a genre of narrative fiction which deals episodically with the adventures of an individual, usually a roguish and dishonest but attractive hero". Bax wrote, "This overture does not pretend to be the prelude to any particular play. It is simply a piece of music associated with some character as d'Artagnan or Casanova." Foreman comments, "From the early appearance of the theme on tuba and, towards the end, on a drunken bassoon, we may deduce that he had a certain Falstaffian weight."

== Performance and reception ==
The score is dated 13 October 1930; the premiere was given by Harty – the dedicatee – and the Hallé on 19 November 1931. The critic Neville Cardus thought the work so appealing that to live up to the overture the putative comedy would have to be "written by Hofmannsthal and Shaw in collaboration. Not often is English music so free and audacious as this, so gay and winning." The Times 's view was that the piece was "gay and impudent, and with that tendency to vulgarity which so easily besets the instinctively refined composer determined to let himself go".

== Score ==
The work is scored for strings; woodwind consisting of three flutes with piccolo, two oboes with cor anglais, three clarinets with bass clarinetand two bassoons with contrabassoon; a brass section of four horns, three trumpets, three trombones and tuba; harp; celeste; and a percussion section of four players. In between the bustling themes that begin and close the nine-minute work is a waltz in the promised Straussian pastiche, in which, Cardus commented, Strauss's characters Octavian, the Marschallin and Till Eulenspiegel play hide and seek.

== Recordings ==
Harty recorded the work for Columbia in 1935, conducting the London Philharmonic Orchestra. Subsequent recordings have been conducted by Dimitri Mitropoulos, Igor Buketoff, Bryden Thomson and David Lloyd-Jones.

== Sources ==
- Sackville-West, Edward; Desmond Shawe-Taylor (1955). The Record Guide. London: Collins. OCLC 500373060.
- Description at the Parlett Pages Bax Worklist (GP 305)
