= Kenneth Colley =

English actor (1937–2025)

- Colley in 2010
- Born: 7 December 1937; Manchester, England
- Died: 30 June 2025 (aged 87); Ashford, Kent, England
- Occupation: Actor
- Years active: 1961–2017
- Spouse: Mary Dunne (m. 1962; died 2018)

Kenneth Colley (7 December 1937 – 30 June 2025), often credited as Ken Colley, was a British film and television actor whose career spanned over 60 years. He came to wider prominence through his role as Admiral Piett in the Star Wars films The Empire Strikes Back (1980) and Return of the Jedi (1983), as well as his roles in the films of Ken Russell and as Jesus in Monty Python's Life of Brian (1979).

== Early life and career ==
Colley was born on 7 December 1937 in Manchester. One of his early appearances on British television was as Noah Riley in the 1970s police drama The Sweeney, in an episode entitled Trap. He played Jesus in Monty Python's Life of Brian (1979), having also appeared in the earlier Monty Python-related production Ripping Yarns episode "The Testing of Eric Olthwaite" alongside Michael Palin. As a Shakespearean actor he played the Duke of Vienna in the BBC Television Shakespeare production of Measure for Measure in 1979. In 1982, he had the lead role of Horatio Nelson in the TV period drama I Remember Nelson.

Colley worked extensively with British director Ken Russell from the early 1970s to the early 1990s as part of a repertory of actors who appeared across Russell's television and film work. He played the role of Modest Tchaikovsky in the film The Music Lovers (1971). He went on to play the role of LeGrand in Russell's The Devils (also 1971); he played the journalist Krenek in the biopic Mahler (1974); the composer Frédéric Chopin in Lisztomania (1975); Mr Brunt in Russell's adaptation of The Rainbow (1989) by D. H. Lawrence. His last roles for Russell were as Captain Dreyfus in the film Prisoner of Honor (1991), which dealt with the Dreyfus affair, and as the composer John Ireland in The Secret Life of Arnold Bax (1992).

For his work in the Star Wars franchise, Colley's role as Admiral Piett is noted for differing from the other ill-fated Imperial officers who appeared alongside him in The Empire Strikes Back (1980), as Colley was the only actor to play an Imperial officer in a second Star Wars film, reprising his role in Return of the Jedi (1983). Colley reprised his role as Piett in the Cartoon Network animated special Lego Star Wars: The Empire Strikes Out in September 2012. Coincidentally, Colley and Darth Vader actor David Prowse had a part in the fantasy film Jabberwocky (1977).

Colley also played a notable role in the 1982 Clint Eastwood film Firefox, where he played a Soviet colonel tasked with the protection of the Firefox and its secrets. He went on to play SS-Standartenführer Paul Blobel in the Second World War drama War and Remembrance.

In 1990, Colley portrayed Napoleon Bonaparte during his last days in exile on St Helena in Napoleon's Last Battle, a BBC Timewatch documentary drama portraying the last days of Napoleon's life in exile on St Helena.

Colley directed Greetings (2007), a horror film starring Kirsty Cox, Henry Dunn and Ben Shockley.

In 2017, Colley recorded a series of short narrations for inclusion on Pop Wasteland, an album by Folkestone band Phenomenal Cat.

== Personal life and death ==
Colley lived in Hythe, Kent. He was married to Mary Dunne from 1962 until her death in 2018.

According to comments which Terry Gilliam (who directed him in Jabberwocky and acted with him in Life of Brian) made in the DVD audio commentaries for both films, Colley had a stammer in real life. When he had a role in a film, however, he could recite the lines perfectly. Stuttering is a character trait, however, in his role as the Accordion Man in the 1978 BBC television drama Pennies from Heaven.

Colley died in Ashford, Kent, on the afternoon of 30 June 2025, at the age of 87. He had injured his arm in a fall, then contracted COVID-19 and pneumonia in hospital.

It was reported that Colley left thousands of pounds to a cats' charity – Rhodes Minnis Cat Sanctuary of Hythe – in his will.

== Filmography ==
=== Film ===
Year	Title	Role	Notes	Ref.
1964	Seventy Deadly Pills	Covent Garden Porter		
1967	The Jokers	De Winter		
1967	How I Won the War	2nd Replacement		
1968	The Blood Beast Terror	James		
1970	Performance	Tony Farrell	credited as Ken Colley	
1971	The Music Lovers	Modest Tchaikovsky		
1971	The Devils	Legrand		
1972	The Triple Echo	Provo Corporal	credited as Ken Colley	
1973	Hitler: The Last Ten Days	Boldt	Uncredited	
1974	Mahler	Krenek	credited as Ken Colley	
1974	Juggernaut	Detective Brown		
1975	Slade in Flame	Tony Devlin		
1975	Lisztomania	Frédéric Chopin	credited as Ken Colley	
1977	Jabberwocky	1st Fanatic		
1979	Monty Python's Life of Brian	Jesus		
1980	The Empire Strikes Back	Admiral Piett		
1981	Peter and Paul	Theodotus		
1982	Firefox	Colonel Kontarsky		
1982	Giro City	Martin Osborne		
1983	The Scarlet and the Black	Captain Hirsch	credited as Ken Colley	
1983	Return of the Jedi	Admiral Piett		
1984	Return to Waterloo	The Traveller		
1986	The Whistle Blower	Bill Pickett		
1988	A Summer Story	Jim	credited as Ken Colley	
1989	The Rainbow	Mr. Brunt	credited as Ken Colley	
1990	The Plot to Kill Hitler	Field Marshal Wilhelm Keitel		
1990	I Hired a Contract Killer	The Killer		
1990	The Last Island	Nick		
1992	La Vie de bohème	Street Sweeper		
1996	El último viaje de Robert Rylands	Archdale		
1996	Brassed Off	Greasley	credited as Ken Colley	
1997	Shadow Run	Larcombe		
1999	Hold Back the Night	Uncle Bob		
1999	Holding On	Phil		
2007	Greetings	Ken	Also director and writer	
2013	Scar Tissue	Weaver		

=== Television ===
Year	Title	Role	Notes	Ref.
1963	The Avengers	Young Man	Episode: "Don't Look Behind You"	
1963	Thorndyke	Ellis	1 episode	
1964	The Other Man	Colin	Part of the Play of the Week series	
1970	Dance of the Seven Veils	Hitler	TV film	
1970–1972	A Family at War	Sergeant Jago		
1971	The Rivals of Sherlock Holmes	Farrish	2 episodes	
1974	The Nine Tailors	"Potty" Peake	TV mini-series (part of Lord Peter Wimsey), Series 1 Episode 3	
1974	Special Branch	Oliver	TV series, Series 4 Episode 9, "Date of Birth"	
1974	Fall of Eagles	Father Gapon	Episode: "Dearest Nicky"	
1975	The Sweeney	Noah Riley	TV series, Series 2 Episode 6, "Trap"	
1977	Ripping Yarns	Arthur, The Robber	Episode: "The Testing of Eric Outhwaite"	
1978	Les Misérables	Police Prefect	TV film	
1978	Pennies from Heaven	The Accordion Man	6 episodes, TV mini-series	
1979	Measure for Measure	Duke	TV film, part of the BBC Television Shakespeare series	
1979	The Danedyke Mystery	Major	6 episodes, TV series	
1982	I Remember Nelson	Admiral Lord Nelson	TV mini-series	
1985	Wallenberg: A Hero's Story	Adolf Eichmann	TV film	
1985	Mussolini: The Untold Story	King Victor Emmanuel III of Italy	TV mini-series	
1986	Return to Treasure Island	Ben Gunn	10 episodes, credited as Ken Colley	
1987	Casanova	Le Duc	TV film	
1988	War and Remembrance	SS Standartenführer Paul Blobel	2 episodes, TV mini-series	
1990	Agatha Christie's Poirot	Mathew Davenheim	Episode: "The Disappearance of Mr. Davenheim"	
1991	Minder	Ron the Burglar	Episode: "Him Indoors"	
1991	Inspector Morse	DCI Patrick Dawson	Episode: "Second Time Around"	
1991	Prisoner of Honor	Captain Alfred Dreyfus	TV film	
1992	The Secret Life of Arnold Bax	John Ireland	TV film	
1993	Unnatural Causes	Inspector Gerry Reckless	TV film	
1993	Between the Lines	Chief Supt. Tattersall	Episode: "Manoeuvre 11"	
1994–1995	Moving Story	Ken Uttley	13 episodes	
1995	Solomon & Sheba	Nathan	TV film	
1996	Wycliffe	Sam Peploe	Episode: "Number of the Beast"	
1995–1999	The Bill	Various characters	3 episodes, credited as Ken Colley in 1999	
1999	The Last Train	Mark	Episode Five, credited as Ken Colley	
2000	Casualty	Clifford Watkins	Episode: "The Turning of the Scrooge"	
2001	Midsomer Murders	Lloyd Kirby	Episode: "The Electric Vendetta"	
2002	Relic Hunter	Professor Lamenza	Episode: "Faux Fox"	
2003	EastEnders	Brian	3 episodes	
2005	Like Father Like Son	Rawsthorne	2 episodes	
2006	Foyle's War	Brian Jones	Episode: "Bad Blood"	
2006	New Tricks	Frank Benson	Episode: "Dockers"	
2009	Casualty 1909	Dr. Frederick Smith	3 episodes	
2012	Lego Star Wars: The Empire Strikes Out	Admiral Piett (voice)	TV film, credited as Kenneth Cooley	
2013	Vera	Ronald Devreux	Series 3, Episode 3 Young Gods	
2013	Misfits	Old Rudy	Series 5, Episode 4	
2016	Peaky Blinders	Vicente Changretta	Series 3, Episodes 2 & 3	
