= Admiral Piett =

Fictional character from Star Wars

- Star Wars character
- Admiral Piett as seen in The Empire Strikes Back
- First appearance: The Empire Strikes Back (1980)
- Created by: George Lucas; Lawrence Kasdan
- Portrayed by: Kenneth Colley
- Voiced by: Rupert Degas (Empire at War); Trevor Devall (Lego Star Wars), Kenneth Colley (Lego Star Wars: The Empire Strikes Out)

In-universe information
- Gender: Male
- Occupation: Executor Commander, Admiral (Galactic Empire)
- Affiliation: Galactic Empire
- Homeworld: Axxila

Admiral Firmus Piett is a fictional character from the Star Wars franchise, first introduced and portrayed by Kenneth Colley in the 1980 film The Empire Strikes Back. As a supporting villain in command of Darth Vader's flagship, Executor, Piett is generally considered to be the most prominent Imperial officer in the film. He subsequently appeared in the sequel Return of the Jedi, making him the only officer in the original trilogy to appear in more than one film and be portrayed by the same actor. Piett also appears in the canon Star Wars novel Lost Stars, and is featured in several more novels, comic books, and video games within the Star Wars Legends line.

== Character ==
=== Development ===
Piett was a creation of George Lucas and Lawrence Kasdan for The Empire Strikes Back and Return of the Jedi. Although Admiral Piett's true first appearance in the Star Wars universe was one month prior to the release of the Empire Strikes Back in the film's novelization, he was brought to life to audiences around the world by British actor Kenneth Colley, who was cast in the role. Colley recalls that Empire Strikes Back director Irvin Kershner stated that for Piett, he was "looking for someone that would frighten Adolf Hitler", and told Colley after meeting him, "Yes, I think you're it". In playing the role, Colley chose not to portray a singular attitude for the character; but instead attempted to bring forth a more true to life humanity in Piett's character, something that he believes ultimately sat quite well with audiences.

== Appearances ==
=== Film ===
==== The Empire Strikes Back ====
Piett served in the Galactic Empire as first officer and captain of the Super Star Destroyer, Executor. While in search of the Rebel base, under the command of Admiral Ozzel, Piett receives a transmission from an Imperial probe droid located in the Hoth system. Although dismissed and ignored by Ozzel who wants proof, not leads, Piett informs Vader of the transmission; which is revealed to be the hidden Rebel Alliance headquarters, Echo Base. Vader then dispatches the Imperial Fleet to Hoth; however, Ozzel orders the fleet to exit hyperspace too close to the planet, enabling them to be detected by the Rebels, who raise an energy shield to stop any orbital bombardment. Ozzel is quickly force choked to death by Vader for his incompetence. Vader then promotes Piett to Admiral, giving him full command of the Executor and the fleet.

After the Battle of Hoth, Piett is tasked with the pursuit of the Millennium Falcon, which has escaped into a nearby asteroid field. Piett informs Vader of this, whilst Vader is in his private chamber aboard the Executor; in doing so, Piett becomes the first onscreen character to see Vader without his helmet. Vader at first ignores Piett's concern over venturing into the field, but later commands the admiral to move the ship away from the asteroids, in order to gain a clear signal for Vader's communication with Emperor Palpatine. Vader subsequently hires bounty hunters to assist in the capture of the Millennium Falcon, a decision which Piett objects to. With the Falcon continuing to evade capture, Vader executes Star Destroyer Avenger captain Needa, conveying his displeasure as an ominous warning to Piett.

With bounty hunter Boba Fett tracking the Falcon to Cloud City on Bespin, Piett has his engineers deactivate the hyperdrive on the ship. Later attempting to escape, the Millennium Falcon, and those within it, are nearly captured when Piett orders the activation of the Executor's tractor beam. However, the Falcon unexpectedly jumps to light-speed and evades capture, as R2-D2 is able to reactivate the hyperdrive. Despite his failure, a visibly terrified Piett finds himself spared by Vader..

==== Return of the Jedi ====
In the following film, Admiral Piett is in command of the Imperial fleet at the Battle of Endor, still aboard the Executor. He first appears in the film when a covert team of Rebels, led by Han Solo aboard the stolen Imperial shuttle attempt to transmit an older valid security code, to allow them shield access and entry to the forest moon of Endor. Piett is then interrupted by Vader, who informs Piett that he will deal with the shuttle personally.

During the Rebel attack on the second Death Star, Piett receives orders from Emperor Palpatine himself to hold position and keep the Rebels from escaping from the Death Star's fully operational superlaser. The plan is disrupted when the Rebels are ordered by Admiral Ackbar to attack the Star Destroyers at point-blank range, concentrating their fire on the Executor. After the Rebel fleet knocks out the shields protecting the bridge, Piett commands his men to increase firepower to keep anything from getting through. A disabled and out of control A-wing fighter smashes into the Executor's bridge, with Piett and Commander Gherant diving into the lower command deck. The incapacitated Destroyer then plunges into the Death Star, exploding in a plume of flame, as Piett meets his demise.

=== Novels ===
As stated in the 2015 Ultimate Star Wars reference book, Piett was born on the Outer Rim world of Axxila, and is confirmed to have the first name Firmus within the new canon. Piett later joins the Imperial Starfleet, and appears in the novel Lost Stars, set eight years after the Clone Wars, under the command of Grand Moff Tarkin at an Imperial annexation on the planet Jelucan. The short story "To the Last" from the short story collection From a Certain Point of View: Return of the Jedi reveals more about Piett's past, how he met an Imperial officer at the age of twelve and decided to join the Navy, and about his last moments.

=== Star Wars Legends ===
Piett has appeared in many novels, comics and video games, now considered to be non-Disney "canon" and part of Star Wars Legends. He is given a much deeper backstory in these various media; As a young lieutenant, Piett impresses Vader with his skill and loyalty, and the Sith lord soon promotes him to captain of the Star Destroyer Accuser and makes him a member of the Empire's "Death Squadron". Winning widespread respect for his survival after the events of The Empire Strikes Back, Piett also participates in the Battle of Mygeeto, before the events leading to his death in Return of the Jedi.

== Reception ==
Over time, the character has become a favorite amongst fans, due to his unusual longevity. According to Colley, the character of Piett was not originally slated to appear in Return of the Jedi, but George Lucas added him because Lucasfilm had received "a lot of fan mail" about the character.
