= The Garden of Fand =

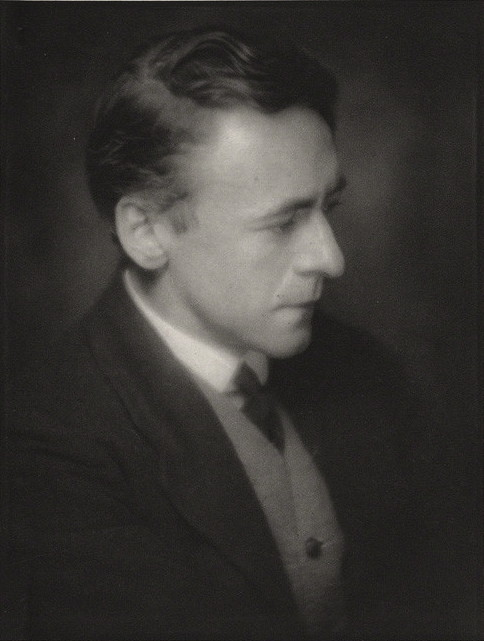
Arnold Bax in 1922

The Garden of Fand (1916) is a tone poem by the English composer Arnold Bax. It was inspired by an Irish mythical figure, Fand, the wife of the lord of the ocean. The work does not portray the events of the mythical tale, but evokes Fand's island. The composer had been greatly influenced by Celtic culture in his earlier works, but described this one as his last in that vein.

== Background ==
The work was complete in piano score shortly before the First World War, and orchestrated in 1916. It was premiered by the Chicago Symphony Orchestra conducted by Frederick Stock on 29 October 1920, and first performed in Britain on 11 December 1920 by the British Symphony Orchestra, conducted by Adrian Boult.

Bax was a great admirer of Celtic culture, including Irish myths, in which the garden of Fand is the sea. The old saga The Sick-bed of Cuchulain tells of a hero, Cuchulain, who is seduced away from home and duty by the Lady Fand, wife of Manannan, lord of the ocean. Cuchulain's wife, Emer, pursues him and persuades Fand to release him. Manannan shakes his "Cloak of Forgetfulness" between Cuchulain and Fand, and each forgets the other completely. Bax did not depict the original story in his symphonic poem, but painted a picture of a ship, cast ashore on Fand's enchanted island. The crew are drawn into Fand's eternal world of dancing and feasting, as the rising sea overwhelms the island, and the garden of Fand is lost from sight.

In a preface to the score states that “The Garden of Fand is the sea” and sets out the legend of Cuchulain, before noting “this tone-poem has no special relation to the events of the above legend”. The composer described the work to his partner, Harriet Cohen, as "the last of my Irish music".

== Music ==
The work is in ternary form, with the music of the opening returning at the end, with Fand's love-song in between. The opening is a shimmering theme played by woodwind, two harps and divided upper strings, with the lower strings playing a rising and falling theme illustrative of the swell of the sea. Fand's song, in the central section, is played by flute and cor anglais in unison, over strings divided into ten parts. Bax's orchestration is on his customary lavish scale. A reviewer in the US after the work was first played there, remarked on the score's "singular poetic intensity, singular eloquence and beauty", although adding that Bax "is, of course, a child of his time, and he cannot forget Debussy". The musical scholar Andrew Keener also notes the Debussian influence: "there is the characteristic writing in parallel thirds that move by whole tones, and brass and woodwind detail which glints out of a surging, opulent orchestral sonority".

Orchestral forces required are three flutes and piccolo, two oboes and cor anglais, three clarinets and bass clarinet, two bassoons and contra bassoon; four horns, three trumpets, trombone and tuba; timpani, glockenspiel, cymbal, bass drum, celesta; two harps and strings.

== Performance history ==
The work has remained among Bax's more popular compositions, even during his most neglected years in the late 1940s and the 1950s. Among those who kept it before the public were Sir Thomas Beecham and Sir John Barbirolli, who played it in concert and made recordings of it: Beecham for 78 rpm records in 1948, and Barbirolli for LP a decade later. With the greatly increased representation of Bax's works in the LP and then the CD catalogues from the 1960s onwards, The Garden of Fand has received several modern recordings, including one conducted by Boult, fifty-two years after he introduced the work to England.

Bax's score was used by Frederick Ashton for his ballet, Picnic at Tintagel (New York City Ballet, 1952), where adultery between Edwardian tourists is contrasted with the tale of Tristran and Iseult; he found the score more suited to dancing than Bax's Tintagel.
