= Symphony No. 6 (Bax) =

Symphony by Arnold Bax

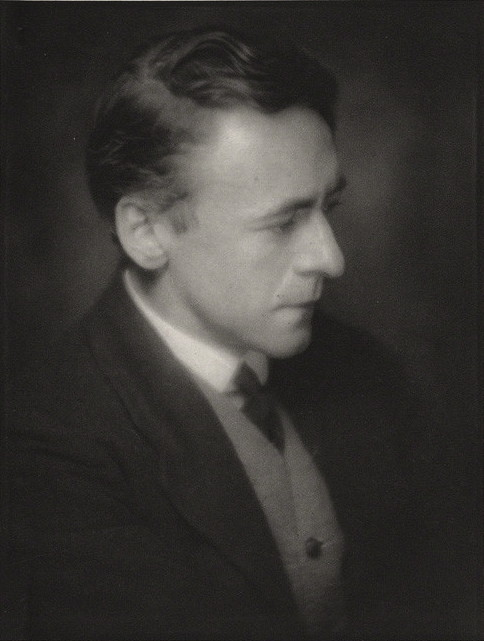
Arnold Bax in 1922

The Symphony No. 6 by Arnold Bax was completed on February 10, 1935. The symphony is dedicated to Sir Adrian Boult. It is, according to David Parlett, "[Bax's] own favourite and widely regarded as his greatest ... powerful and tightly controlled". It was given its world premiere by the Royal Philharmonic on November 21 of the year of composition, 1935. It is No. 331 in Grahame Parlett's catalogue of Bax's music.

It is in three movements:

1. Moderato – Allegro con fuoco
2. Lento molto espressivo
3. Introduction (Lento moderato) – Scherzo & Trio (Allegro vivace – Andante semplice) – Epilogue (Lento)

The first movement opens with a moderato ostinato on bass trombone, cellos, and bassoon, with the woodwinds and horns on top playing grinding, dissonant chords. The following allegro con fuoco section gives the ostinato to the violas, this time in diminution. A more lyrical second subject follows, before the main motives return to recapitulate in the shortest opening movement of all Bax's symphonies.

Likewise, the idyllic middle movement is Bax's shortest second movement. The violins introduce the main melody near the beginning and it is eventually taken up by the other sections of the orchestra, with an almost jazzy trumpet solo in the middle. It ends peacefully as to set up the last movement.

Bax's longest finale, the last movement opens with an extended, mysterious clarinet solo which forms a basis for much of the material throughout the movement. Then the other woodwinds play the second main melodic idea for the movement, which forms a basis for the scherzo, trio and the climax towards the end of the symphony. The main melodic ideas are characteristically stated in full force of the orchestra just before the tranquil epilogue which closes the symphony. In the middle of the movement (fig.25 through 27), the music incorporates a detailed reference to an idea from Jean Sibelius's tone poem Tapiola.

The symphony is scored for piccolo, 3 flutes, 2 oboes, English horn, 3 clarinets, bass clarinet, 2 bassoons, double bassoon, 4 horns, 3 trumpets, 3 trombones, tuba, percussion (timpani, bass drum, tenor drum, snare drum, cymbals, tambourine, triangle, gong, and glockenspiel), celesta, harp and, strings.
