= Symphony No. 1 (Bax) =

Symphony by Arnold Bax

The Symphony No. 1 by Arnold Bax was completed in 1922 and dedicated to John Ireland. The three movements of the symphony are:

1. Allegro moderato e feroce – Moderato expressivo – Tempo I
2. Lento solenne
3. Allegro maestoso – Allegro vivace ma non troppo

The outer movements are based on a Piano Sonata in E♭ that Bax subsequently orchestrated, while the central movement was newly composed for the symphony.

It is scored for 4 flutes (3rd doubling alto flute, 4th doubling piccolo), 2 oboes, 1 English horn, 1 heckelphone or bass oboe, 3 clarinets (3rd doubling E♭ clarinet), 1 bass clarinet, 2 bassoons, 1 sarrusophone or contrabassoon, 4 horns, 3 trumpets, 3 trombones, 1 tuba, percussion (timpani, bass drum, tenor drum, snare drum, tambourine, cymbals, gong, triangle, bells, xylophone, and glockenspiel), celesta, 2 harps and strings.

The first performance took place on 4 December 1922 at Queen's Hall in London. The London Symphony Orchestra was conducted by Albert Coates.

Paul Conway noted that "this assured score served notice that Bax, a proven master of the tone poem, was also a symphonist of the front rank". The work is in many ways autobiographical with some music critics suggesting they could find references within the work to the Great War.

== Recordings ==
- Vernon Handley / BBC Philharmonic
- Myer Fredman / London Philharmonic Orchestra
- Bryden Thomson / London Philharmonic Orchestra
