= Symphony No. 5 (Bax) =

Symphony by Arnold Bax

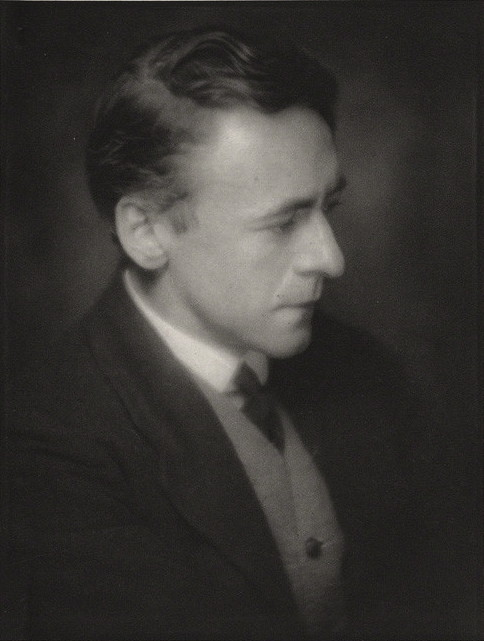
Arnold Bax in 1922

The Symphony No. 5 by Arnold Bax was completed in 1932 and dedicated to Jean Sibelius. It is in many ways heavily influenced by Sibelius.

There are three movements:

1. Poco lento – Allegro con fuoco
2. Poco lento – Molto tranquillo
3. Poco moderato – Allegro – Epilogue

It opens with a five-note motif that is used throughout the entire poco lento section, which is heavily reminiscent of Sibelius's Symphony No. 5. The allegro con fuoco section that follows however is highly Baxian, and all the features of his composition style are evident here. The second subject sees the return of Sibelian moods, but Bax's comprehensive musical technique is noticeable. The recapitulation is particularly exciting, making it one of the most energetic opening movements of all Bax's symphonies.

The second movement is majestic and a relatively short slow movement for Bax, but makes good use of brass and the percussion section. It ends calmly as to ensure a contrast between this movement and the one that follows.

The finale begins with strong, repeated chords from the strings and woodwinds which quickly give way to a fast, fiery and energetic allegro section in which the influences of Russian composers is evident. Unlike in the previous symphonies, the epilogue is bold and majestic.

The symphony is scored for two piccolos, three flutes, two oboes, English horn, three clarinets, bass clarinet, two bassoons, double bassoon, four horns, three trumpets, three trombones, tuba, timpani, bass drum, tenor drum, snare drum, tambourine, cymbals, gong, glockenspiel, harp and strings.

== Reception ==
Tim Mahon of AllMusic described it as "a work deserving of frequent listening and much greater familiarity than it currently enjoys."
