= Tintagel (Bax) =

1919 composition by Arnold Bax

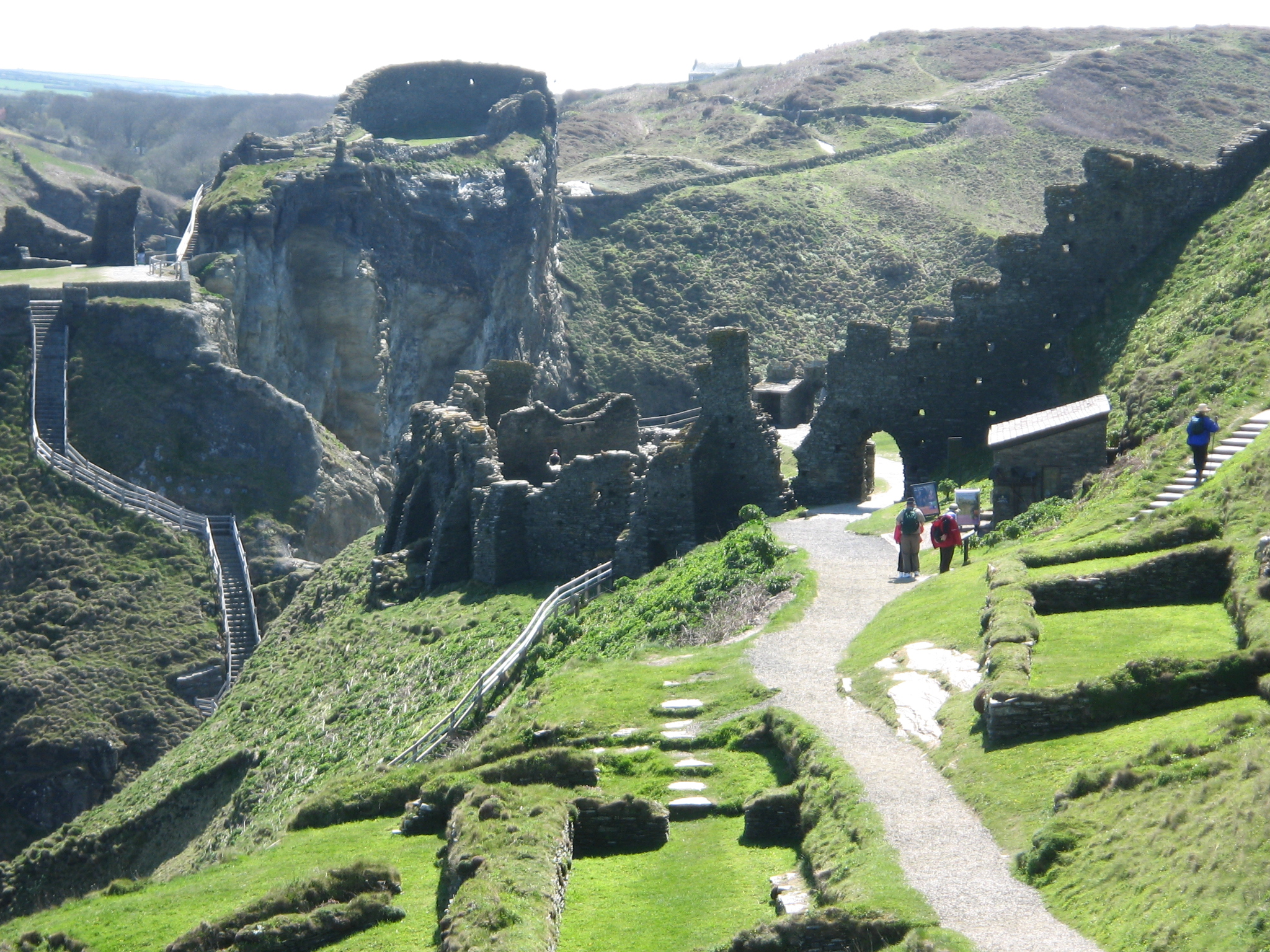
Tintagel Castle

Tintagel is a symphonic poem by Arnold Bax. It is his best-known work, and was for some years the only piece by which the composer was known to many concert-goers. The work was inspired by a visit Bax made to Tintagel Castle in Cornwall in 1917, and, although not explicitly programmatic, draws on the history and mythology associated with the castle.

== History ==
During the late summer of 1917 Bax, together with the pianist Harriet Cohen, with whom he was having a passionate love affair, spent six weeks in Cornwall. They visited Tintagel Castle which inspired the composer to write a symphonic poem. The piece was fully sketched during October 1917 and orchestrated between then and January 1919. It is dedicated to Cohen.

In a programme note written in 1922 Bax stated that the piece is "only in the broadest sense programme music". He aimed, he said, to offer an impression of the cliffs and castle of Tintagel and the sea "on a sunny but not windless summer day", and to reflect some of the literary and traditional associations of the scene.

Tintagel was premiered in Bournemouth on 20 October 1921 by the Bournemouth Municipal Orchestra conducted by Dan Godfrey. The Musical Times reported:

On October 20 interest was chiefly centred in ... the actual first performance of a new composition by Arnold Bax, entitled Tintagel. This was very successfully produced, Mr. Bax being the recipient of a genuine outburst of applause. Lovely passages abound in his score, and the poetic quality of the music is everywhere exemplified. One felt, however, that a better structural balance could have been obtained, and that a keener sense of climax would have improved this deeply-felt piece of writing. Mr. Godfrey's handling of the intricate score was above reproach.

== Structure ==
In Bax's published analysis:

The music opens, after a few introductory bars, with a theme given out on the brass which may be taken as representing the ruined castle. ... This subject is worked to a broad diatonic climax, and is followed by a long melody for strings which may suggest the serene and almost limitless spaces of ocean. After a while a more restless mood begins to assert itself as though the sea were rising.

At this point, Bax writes, he sought to convey a sense of stress and to conjure up the dramatic legends of King Arthur and King Mark. "A wailing chromatic figure is heard and gradually dominates the music", at which point Bax quotes a theme from Wagner's Tristan and Isolde (a work set in and off the coast of Cornwall). There follows what Bax called "a great climax suddenly subsiding", which is followed by a passage intended to convey the impression of "immense waves slowly gathering force until they smash themselves upon the impregnable rocks". The theme of the sea is repeated, and the work ends with the return of the opening image of "the castle still proudly fronting the sun and wind of centuries".

== Recordings ==
When Bax's music underwent a decade and more of neglect after his death in 1953, Tintagel was alone among his works in retaining a firm place in the repertoire. By 2014 the work had received fifteen recordings. The earliest was made for His Master's Voice in 1928, with New Symphony Orchestra conducted by Eugene Goossens; it was the only recording made during the composer's lifetime, and, at 2015, is by some way the fastest performance on record, playing for 12 minutes 10 seconds. In the view of The Penguin Guide to Recorded Classical Music the benchmark recording is that by the London Symphony Orchestra conducted by Sir John Barbirolli, first issued in 1967. That recording plays for 15 minutes.

== Notes ==
=== Sources ===
- Foreman, Lewis (1983). Bax: A Composer and His Times. London and Berkeley: Scolar Press. ISBN 978-0-85967-643-4.
- March, Ivan; Edward Greenfield; Robert Layton; Paul Czajkowski, eds. (2008). The Penguin Guide to Recorded Classical Music 2009. London: Penguin. ISBN 978-0-141-03335-8.
