= Harriet Cohen =

British pianist (1895–1967)

Harriet Cohen CBE
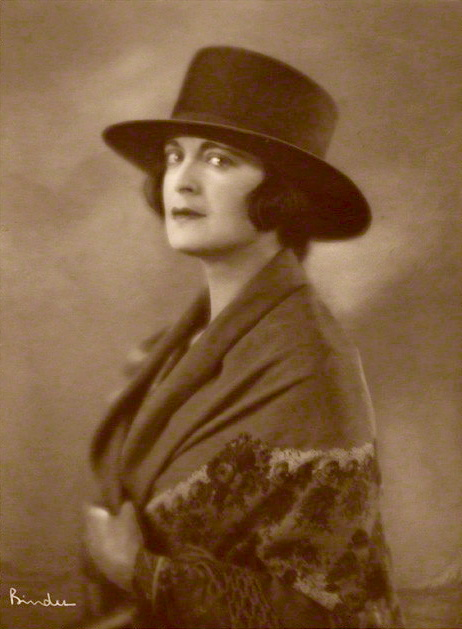
- Cohen photographed by Alexander Binder, early 1920s
- Born: Harriet Pearl Alice Cohen; 2 December 1895; London, England
- Died: 13 November 1967 (aged 71); London, England
- Partner: Arnold Bax
- Relatives: Moses Samuel (great-great-grandfather)
- Musical career
- Education: Royal Academy of Music; Tobias Matthay Pianoforte School
- Genre: Classical
- Occupation: Concert pianist
- Instrument: Piano
- Years active: 1907–1960

Harriet Pearl Alice Cohen CBE (2 December 1895 – 13 November 1967) was a British pianist.

== Early life and education ==
Cohen was born on 2 December 1895 at 58 Angell Road in Brixton to Joseph Woolf Cohen (later Verney), a company secretary, accountant and composer of Jewish–Lithuanian descent, and Florence Cohen (née White, later Verney), a piano teacher of Polish–Jewish descent. The maternal great-great-granddaughter of the writer, watchmaker and translator Moses Samuel, Cohen was related to the pianist Irene Scharrer. The eldest of four siblings, Cohen was the sister of the soprano, broadcaster and educator Myra Verney (1905–1993).

Attending the Royal Academy of Music (RAM) from 1909 to 1915, Cohen studied piano under Tobias Matthay and Felix Swinstead and theory and composition under Frederick Corder. (Note: Also cited as 1912 to 1917.) Whilst at RAM Cohen won the Sterndale Bennett, Edward Nicholls, and Hine prize, and was the youngest person to be awarded the Ada Lewis scholarship. During this period Cohen also studied at the Tobias Matthay Pianoforte School.

== Career ==
In 1914, Cohen made her debut at a Chappell's Sunday concert at the Queen's Hall. At this stage Cohen also had ambitions to be a composer: her Russian Impressions for piano (composed circa 1913) became her only original compositions to be published. Her first major appearance was in 1920 when she appeared at the Wigmore Hall in a joint recital with the tenor John Coates. She became particularly associated with contemporary British music, giving the world premiere of Ralph Vaughan Williams' Piano Concerto (which was written for her) and recording Edward Elgar's Piano Quintet with the Stratton Quartet under the composer's supervision. A number of composers wrote music specifically for her, including John Ireland, Béla Bartók, Ernest Bloch and E. J. Moeran, and particularly Sir Arnold Bax (Cohen's lover), who wrote most of his piano pieces for her. This includes the music for David Lean's 1948 film version of Oliver Twist. He also composed Concertino for Left Hand for her after she lost the use of her right hand in 1948. The last six pieces in the collection Mikrokosmos by Bartók are dedicated to her.

Cohen made the first of several BBC Radio broadcasts in 1927. She appeared on the BBC's nascent television service as early as 2 May 1938, performing music by Thomas Arne and Bach in a half-hour concert at their Alexandra Palace studio.

She dedicated an important effort to the performance of the Tudor composers at a time when this was unusual, and gave recitals of works by William Byrd and Orlando Gibbons and also of Henry Purcell. She was considered one of the finest performers of J. S. Bach's keyboard music, winning outstanding praise from the musicologist Alfred Einstein. Pablo Casals, also, invited her to play Bach with his orchestra at Barcelona, and Wilhelm Furtwängler extended a similar invitation on hearing her in Switzerland. She gave the first 'all-Bach' recital at the Queen's Hall in 1925.

She also cultivated Spanish music, and gave the second performance of Manuel de Falla's Nights in the Gardens of Spain, a work which became especially associated with her. She was also an early exponent of music of the Soviet Union in Britain, and visited Russia in 1935 to broadcast from Moscow and Leningrad, including works by Shostakovich, Kabalevsky and Leonid Polovinkin. These composers later sent her further compositions.

Cohen's influence went well beyond that of a musician. She became strongly associated in the 1930s with publicising the plight of German and Austrian Jews and even played a concert with the scientist Albert Einstein (Alfred's cousin) in 1934 to raise funds to bring Jewish scientists out of Germany. She became a close friend of Eleanor Roosevelt and Ramsay MacDonald as well as the first president of Israel, Chaim Weizmann.

Cohen was also a close friend of many leading figures of the time. These included not only musicians such as Jean Sibelius, Ralph Vaughan Williams, Sir Edward Elgar and Sir William Walton, but also writers such as Arnold Bennett, George Bernard Shaw, H. G. Wells and D. H. Lawrence as well as politicians or entrepreneurs such as Max Beaverbrook and Leslie Viscount Runciman. Cohen became one of the most talked-about and photographed musicians of her day.

She was vice-president of the Women's Freedom League, and was for several years associated with the Jewish National Fund and the Palestine Conservatoire of Music at Jerusalem. Cohen was appointed a Commander of the Order of the British Empire (CBE) in 1938. She was made Commander of the Order of the Crown of Belgium in 1947 and received the Order of the White Lion of Czechoslovakia that same year. The Harriet Cohen International Music Award was introduced in her honour in 1951. Also in 1951 she was awarded Officier de l’Académie française. She was made a Cavalier of the Order of the Southern Cross of Brazil in 1954 and was made a Freeman of the City of London in the same year. Also in 1954, she was a recipient in Helsinki of the medal of the Sibelius Academy. She received the Stella Della Solidarietà Italiana in 1955. In 1958 Cohen was awarded the Pro Finlandia Medal of the Order of the Lion of Finland for her services to Finnish music.

She was the guest "castaway" on Desert Island Discs in January 1955 and was the subject of This Is Your Life in 1959 when she was surprised by Eamonn Andrews at the BBC Television Theatre.

She died in London. Her ashes rest in the Memorial Gardens at Stoke Poges, Buckinghamshire.

== Efforts for refugees from Nazism ==
Harriet Cohen met the American journalist Dorothy Thompson in 1930 on her first tour of America, a tour which took in New York, Washington and the Library of Congress and Chicago, thus finally establishing a name for herself on the International stage. It was a meeting that was to change Cohen's life and awaken her Jewish consciousness. In 1933 Harriet Cohen travelled to Vienna to play a number of concerts, staying with Dorothy Thompson. She was profoundly moved by the plight of refugees, both Jewish and non-Jewish, who were pouring into the city from Germany. Thompson and Cohen were to correspond about the plight of Jewish refugees in Austria and Germany. Cohen was then able to pass on information from Thompson directly to the British Prime Minister, Ramsay MacDonald, who was at this time her intimate friend. Cohen met Thompson every time she went to America thereafter. From 1933 Cohen committed herself to work in Britain and the United States on behalf of refugees. This would result in a concert in America with Albert Einstein in 1934 to raise funds to bring Jewish scientists out of Germany.

In 1935 Ramsay MacDonald warned Cohen not to travel through Germany because the British Government would not be able to provide immunity for her. Soon after, Adolf Hitler passed the Nuremberg laws totally excluding Jews from public life.

Harriet Cohen had met Albert Einstein in Germany in 1929 when she had afternoon tea at his house. At the time Einstein disclosed that he played the violin and said that one day they should play together. Cohen kept her friendship with Einstein even after he had fled Germany in 1933. Cohen would often visit him in Oxford, England where he settled for a short time. Harriet's sister Myra studied there at Somerville College, where she gave a piano concert. In 1934, after Einstein moved to the United States, Harriet Cohen did finally play that duet concert with Einstein to raise funds to bring Jewish scientists out of Nazi Germany. Cohen and Einstein remained friends thereafter and he referred to her as "the beloved piano witch".

It was not until 1939 when she first met Chaim Weizmann, the future first President of Israel, that she began to support the Zionist cause and a Jewish homeland. Cohen's 1939 visit to Palestine extended her reputation there both as a concert pianist and politically. She argued with British and Jewish officials to try to get Jewish refugees admitted on ships from Nazi Germany (rather than be returned), once almost precipitating an International incident. Harriet Cohen believed passionately in a Jewish homeland but with justice to the Arab Palestinians. She survived two assassination attempts during her trip to Palestine. It was when Cohen was having dinner with Weizmann in London that Weizmann heard the news of the British Government's 1939 white paper to limit Jewish immigration to Britain to just 15,000 people a year. Blanche Dugdale, Arthur Balfour's niece, a fellow diner, prophetically said in an agonised voice, "What will happen to the millions fleeing from Hitler?"

== Soviet composers ==
The visit in spring 1935 by Cohen to the Soviet Union was another major milestone in her career. It was the country from which her ancestors had fled 100 years earlier. Not only was Cohen bringing British music to the USSR by playing pieces by Vaughan Williams, Bax, Bliss and Ireland, she also performed Shostakovich's Preludes, Kabalevsky's Sonatina, and the Soviet premiere of Leonid Polovinkin's Suite from manuscript. Thereafter she took their music all over Europe and was acclaimed as the first musician outside the USSR to learn Shostakovich's Twenty-Four Preludes, which he composed in 1932 and 1933.

== Relationship with Sir Arnold Bax ==
"One day I will let my music give itself up to love – love without strife or fret or circumstances – just the praise to you". "My mouth longs for your soft mouth...". These are just two quotes from the love letters between Sir Arnold Bax and Harriet Cohen.

Harriet Cohen's love affair with Bax lasted for over forty years until he died in 1953. It was Bax who gave Harriet Cohen the name "Tania", by which she was affectionately known by close friends and family. Their passionate affair started in 1914 when she was 19 and he was 31, although they had met two years earlier. Bax was creatively inspired by Cohen and in 1915 wrote for her within 13 days three pieces including "The Princess's Rose Garden", "The Maiden with the Daffodil" and "In the Vodka Shop".

Some believe that their time together inspired his famous tone-poem Tintagel, in which he may have in part expressed his anguish at "the dream their world denied". The affair led to Bax's ultimate decision to leave his wife and children in 1918, but they could never live openly together because Bax's wife refused a divorce. Neither could their relationship be recognised publicly because of the social climate of their generation. Cohen possibly became pregnant with Bax's child in 1919 but if she did, she lost the child in an early miscarriage. Harriet Cohen's recently published letters reveal the turbulence and anguish of the relationship. Cohen always claimed that the long-standing affair denied her becoming a "Dame", but this is not substantiated. Through the 1930s their relationship became less passionate as her international career flourished, and Bax sought a quieter haven with his gentler mistress Mary Gleaves; nonetheless the affair continued and they remained close, as private letters between Cohen and Bax reveal. In 1936, for example, they travelled together to Stockholm and Helsinki and met Jean Sibelius, a composer who had long influenced Bax's music.

On 23 September 1947, Bax's wife Elsa ("Elsita") died. Cohen probably expected to finally marry Bax after an affair that had now lasted 30 years. Events were to unfold quite differently. Bax did not initially inform Cohen about the death of his wife, a fact she was to discover in May 1948 whilst recording the music that Bax had written for the film Oliver Twist, when Elsa's will was published. A greater shock followed, when Bax revealed his secret twenty-year affair with Gleaves and his intention not to remarry. This was at a time when Cohen was losing prominence in Britain, and in May 1948 Cohen had an accident with a tray of glasses, which severed the artery in her right hand thus restricting her performing career for some years.

When Bax died on 3 October 1953, Cohen was deeply affected by his death. His will bequeathed half of his interest from his literary and musical compositions to Cohen for life, and half to Mary Gleaves. After their death his royalties and estate were to pass to his children. Cohen also kept the London property that Bax had bought for her – throughout Cohen's life Bax had financially assisted her.

== Other relationships ==
British Prime Minister Ramsay MacDonald was one of her more prominent relationships. Cohen became close to MacDonald during the period when he was Prime Minister from 1929 to 1935, at a time of economic instability and depression which saw the rise of Nazism and Fascism in Europe. It was rumoured that MacDonald and Cohen became lovers. Their letters reflect a closeness; and she often visited him alone at 10 Downing Street and his home in Hampstead. Certainly many people did believe they were lovers and Cohen was often referred to as "the old man's darling".

Cohen was also close to Max Beaverbrook, the founder of Express newspapers and an important entrepreneur of the day. Cohen was introduced to the business tycoon Max Beaverbrook by Arnold Bennett in 1923. Beaverbrook was instantly charmed by Cohen and invited her to dine regularly with him from 1923 and through him met Lord Rothermere and Lloyd George. Beaverbrook and Cohen often met at her house, as noted in her autobiography A Bundle of Time. He was besotted with her in his own way and showered her regularly with a hundred or more roses.

Ralph Vaughan Williams was an intimate lifelong friend of Cohen. His letters to her reveal a flirtatious relationship, regularly reminding her of the thousands of kisses that she owed him. He was a regular visitor to her home and often attended parties that Cohen held for her friends. She loved entertaining and inviting famous and prominent people. Cohen premiered Vaughan Williams' "Hymn Tune Prelude" in 1930 which he dedicated to her. She later introduced the piece throughout Europe during her concert tours. In 1933 she premiered his Piano Concerto in C major, a work which was once again dedicated to her. Cohen was given the exclusive right to play the piece for a period of time.

Cohen first played for Edward Elgar in 1914 at a party when she was 18. They became close friends until his death in 1934. In 1933 Cohen organised a concert in his honour under the patronage of the King and Queen. Undoubtedly Elgar doted on Cohen and closely followed her career, giving her constant support. Under Elgar's direction she made a recording of his Piano Quintet with the Stratton String Quartet. Elgar had only sketched it but he gave the short score to Harriet for the recording.

H. G. Wells was part of Harriet Cohen's circle of male admirers from the 1920s. After Wells parted from writer and novelist Rebecca West, it is well known that Wells took up brief liaisons with other women. Harriet Cohen is highly likely to have been one of these, as various letters from her private collection and interviews suggest. She had a magnetic personality and beauty which Wells found irresistible.

D. H. Lawrence became a close friend of Cohen's. It was clear already in 1915 that this friendship had created some tensions between Cohen and Arnold Bax. Bax protested at Cohen's closeness to Lawrence. She told Lawrence that they would have to meet secretly. In demonstrative mood that day, Lawrence scrawled across her autograph book "The door closed". A short time later Cohen contracted tuberculosis, possibly from Lawrence, who died of the disease in 1930. Cohen always denied any sexual relationship with Lawrence to Bax, but many believed she and Lawrence were lovers. Nonetheless, Lawrence and Cohen remained good friends and were regularly seeing each other as least as part of a group of friends up until his death. They would often talk together about the music of their common friend Elgar.

Cohen was introduced to William Walton in 1923 by Arnold Bennett. They carried on a rather flirtatious friendship which Cohen described in her autobiography as "stormy but delightful". She wrote that the irritation they often felt for each other did not lessen the underlying affection. Cohen championed Walton's music both at home and abroad especially in the late 1920s and early '30s. On assigning to Cohen the premier performance of his Sinfonia Concertante in 1927 he said to her "I know it will be in safe hands".

Rosa Newmarch introduced Harriet Cohen to Jean Sibelius in London 1921 and they spent some time together. In the summer 1936 Cohen travelled in Finland with Arnold Bax and they had long discussions with Sibelius both in Helsinki and Ainola. Sibelius even wrote her the opening chord of his eighth symphony on a cigarette packet. The Eighth Symphony was lost.

However, her most important relationship was probably with Arnold Bennett. "Arnold Bennett, dear friend and mentor of my youth died on 27 March 1931" wrote Cohen in her autobiography. Bennett was one of Cohen's closest friends and responsible for introducing her to many of her new friends. Bennett introduced Cohen to William Walton and Max Beaverbrook in 1923. Cohen was devastated on Bennett's sudden death from typhoid fever on 27 March 1931. She had spoken to him only a few days earlier, when he had told her how unwell he was feeling. It was Bennett who had kept Cohen on the rails for over a decade giving her honest, blunt necessary advice. Cohen listened to him and respected his judgement. He had guided her when she was in her 20s when her reputation and fame was growing both at home and abroad.

== Depictions ==
Harriet Cohen was portrayed in two novels.

Rebecca West based the main character of Harriet in her novel Harriet Hume (1929) on Harriet Cohen. The novel is described as a modernist story about a piano-playing prodigy and her obsessive lover, a corrupt politician. The novel immortalised Harriet's love affair with the composer Arnold Bax.

William Gerhardie cast Cohen as the heroine Helen Sapphire in the book Pending Heaven and much of what is written mirrors Cohen's own life and character as well as her turbulent relationship with Gerhardie. Helen Sapphire is a musician who performs successfully all over Europe. She plays the harp and the piano. Gerhardie personified himself in the central character of Max who dreams about Helen.

She was portrayed by Glenda Jackson in the 1992 Ken Russell film The Secret Life of Arnold Bax.

Dearest Tania, a words-and-music programme telling the story of Cohen, written by Duncan Honeybourne, premiered in 2006, performed with actress Louisa Clein.

== Legacy ==
- Harriet Cohen International Music Award

The Harriet Cohen International Music Award was founded in 1951.

- Harriet Cohen Bach Prize

The Harriet Cohen Bach Prize was established in 1994. It is awarded by the Musicians' Company for the most deserving pupil at the Royal Academy of Music in the field of Bach piano playing. The most recent recipient was Adam Heron in 2020.

Cohen was an art collector, and left over 40 paintings to the Royal Academy of Music, including works by Marc Chagall and Camille Pissarro, as well as British artists such as Duncan Grant, J. D. Fergusson, C. R. W. Nevinson, and Edward Wolfe.

== Sources ==
- Hart, Ronald J. D'Arcy, ed. (1958). The Samuel Family of Liverpool and London. From 1755 onwards. London: Routledge & Kegan Paul.
- Cohen, Harriet A Bundle of Time (1969)
- Brook, Donald, Masters of the Keyboard (Rockliff, London 1955 printing), 151–152.
