= Arnold Bax =

English composer (1883–1953)

Sir Arnold Bax KCVO
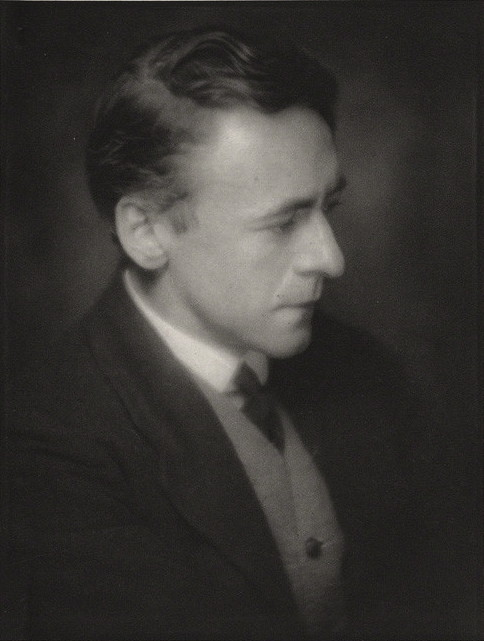
- Portrait c. 1922
- Born: 8 November 1883; Streatham, Surrey, England
- Died: 3 October 1953 (aged 69); Cork, Ireland
- Education: Royal Academy of Music
- Occupations: Composer; author
- Works: List of compositions
- Partner: Harriet Cohen
- Relatives: Clifford Bax (brother)

17th Master of the King's Music
- In office February 1942 – 3 October 1953
- Monarchs: George VI; Elizabeth II
- Preceded by: Walford Davies
- Succeeded by: Arthur Bliss

Sir Arnold Edward Trevor Bax (8 November 1883 – 3 October 1953) was an English composer, poet, and author. His prolific output includes songs, choral music, chamber pieces, and solo piano works, but he is best known for his orchestral music. In addition to a series of symphonic poems, he wrote seven symphonies and was for a time widely regarded as the leading British symphonist.

Bax was born in the London suburb of Streatham to a prosperous family. He was encouraged by his parents to pursue a career in music, and his private income enabled him to follow his own path as a composer without regard for fashion or orthodoxy. Consequently, he came to be regarded in musical circles as an important but isolated figure. While still a student at the Royal Academy of Music Bax became fascinated with Ireland and Celtic culture, which became a strong influence on his early development. In the years before the First World War he lived in Ireland and became a member of Dublin literary circles, writing fiction and verse under the pseudonym Dermot O'Byrne. Later, he developed an affinity with Nordic culture, which for a time superseded his Celtic influences in the years after the First World War.

Between 1910 and 1920 Bax wrote a large amount of music, including the symphonic poem Tintagel, his best-known work. During this period he formed a lifelong association with the pianist Harriet Cohen – at first an affair, then a friendship, and always a close professional relationship. In the 1920s he began the series of seven symphonies which form the heart of his orchestral output. In 1942 Bax was appointed Master of the King's Music, but composed little in that capacity. In his last years he found his music regarded as old-fashioned, and after his death it was generally neglected. From the 1960s, mainly through a growing number of commercial recordings, his music was gradually rediscovered, although little of it is regularly heard in the concert hall.

== Life and career ==
=== Early years ===
Bax was born on 8 November 1883 in the London suburb of Streatham, Surrey, to a prosperous Victorian family. He was the eldest son of Alfred Ridley Bax and his wife, Charlotte Ellen, daughter of Rev. William Knibb Lea, of Amoy, China. The couple's youngest son, Clifford Lea Bax, became a playwright and essayist. (Note: Their siblings were Alfred (1884–95) and Evelyn (1887–1984).) Alfred Bax was a barrister of the Middle Temple, but having a private income he did not practise. In 1896 the family moved to a mansion in Hampstead. Bax later wrote that although it would have been good to be raised in the country, the large gardens of the family house were the next best thing. He was a musical child: "I cannot remember the long-lost day when I was unable to play the piano – inaccurately".

After a preparatory school in Balham, Bax attended the Hampstead Conservatoire during the 1890s. The establishment was run – "with considerable personal pomp", according to Bax – by Cecil Sharp, whose passion for English folk-song and folk-dance excited no response in his pupil. An enthusiasm for folk music was widespread among British composers of the late 19th and early 20th centuries, including Parry, Stanford, Vaughan Williams and Holst; Sullivan and Elgar stood aloof, as did Bax, who later put into general circulation the saying, "You should make a point of trying every experience once, excepting incest and folk-dancing." (Note: This bon mot, often misattributed to Sir Thomas Beecham, first appeared in print in Bax's memoirs, ascribed to an unnamed "sympathetic Scot", later identified as the conductor Guy Warrack.)

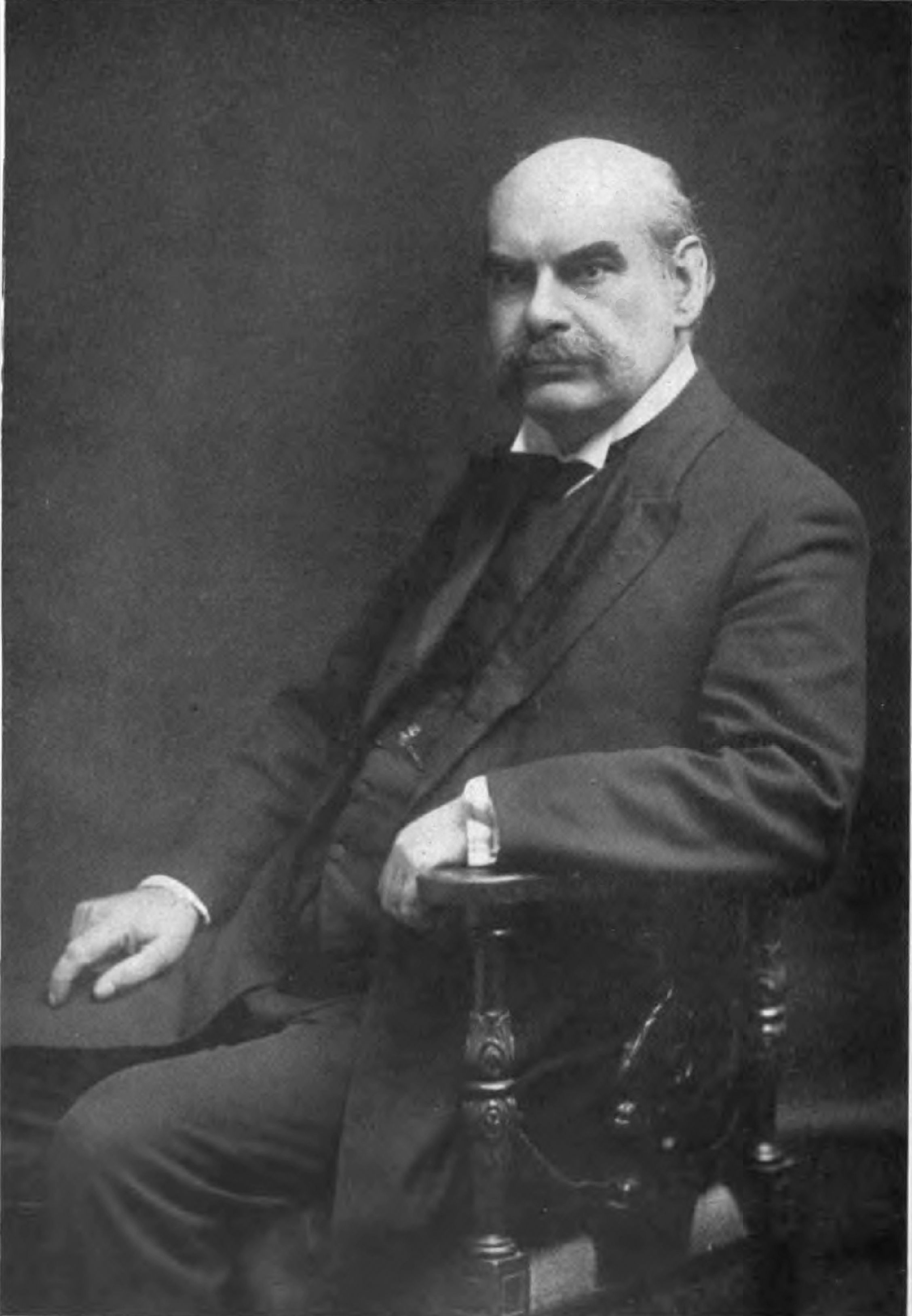
Frederick Corder (in 1913), Bax's composition teacher

In 1900 Bax moved on to the Royal Academy of Music, where he remained until 1905, studying composition with Frederick Corder and piano with Tobias Matthay. Corder was a devotee of the works of Wagner, whose music was Bax's principal inspiration in his early years. He later observed, "For a dozen years of my youth I wallowed in Wagner's music to the almost total exclusion – until I became aware of Richard Strauss – of any other". Bax also discovered and privately studied the works of Debussy, whose music, like that of Strauss, was frowned on by the largely conservative faculty of the academy.

Although Bax won a Macfarren Scholarship for composition and other important prizes, and was known for his exceptional ability to read complex modern scores on sight, he attracted less recognition than his contemporaries Benjamin Dale and York Bowen. His keyboard technique was formidable, but he had no desire for a career as a soloist. (Note: He had even less desire to conduct, vowed never to do so, and broke the vow only once, in 1906.) Unlike most of his contemporaries, he had private means that made him free to pursue his musical career as he chose, without the necessity of earning an income. The Times considered that Bax's independence and disinclination to heed his teachers ultimately damaged his art, because he did not develop the discipline to express his imagination to the greatest effect.

After leaving the Academy, Bax visited Dresden, where he saw the original production of Strauss's Salome, and first heard the music of Mahler, which he found "eccentric, long-winded, muddle-headed, and yet always interesting". Among the influences on the young Bax was the Irish poet W. B. Yeats; Bax's brother Clifford introduced him to Yeats's poetry and to Ireland. Influenced by Yeats's The Wanderings of Oisin, Bax visited the west coast of Ireland in 1902, and found that "in a moment the Celt within me stood revealed". His first composition to be performed – at an academy concert in 1902 – was an Irish dialect song called "The Grand Match".

=== Early career ===
I worked very hard at the Irish language and steeped myself in its history and saga, folk-tale and fairy-lore. ... Under this domination, my musical style became strengthened ... I began to write Irishly, using figures and melodies of a definitely Celtic curve.

— Bax in his memoirs, 1943

Musically, Bax veered away from the influence of Wagner and Strauss, and deliberately adopted what he conceived of as a Celtic idiom. In 1908 he began a cycle of tone poems called Eire, described by his biographer Lewis Foreman as the beginning of the composer's truly mature style. The first of these pieces, Into the Twilight, was premiered by Thomas Beecham and the New Symphony Orchestra in April 1909, and the following year, at Elgar's instigation, Henry Wood, commissioned the second in the cycle, In the Faëry Hills. The work received mixed notices. The Manchester Guardian's reviewer wrote, "Mr Bax has happily suggested the appropriate atmosphere of mystery"; The Observer found the piece "very undeterminate and unsatisfying, but not difficult to follow". The Times commented on the "rather second-hand language" at some points, derivative of Wagner and Debussy, although "there is still a great deal which is wholly individual". The Musical Times praised "a mystic glamour that could not fail to be felt by the listener" although the coherence of the piece "was not instantly discernible". A third work in the cycle, Roscatha, was not performed in the composer's lifetime. (Note: The work was recorded in 1985 by the Ulster Orchestra conducted by Bryden Thomson.)

Bax's private means enabled him to travel to the Russian Empire in 1910. He was in pursuit of Natalia Skarginska, a young Ukrainian whom he had met in London – one of several women with whom he fell in love over the years. The visit eventually proved a failure from the romantic point of view but musically enriched him. In Saint Petersburg he discovered and immediately loved ballet; he absorbed Russian musical influences that inspired material for the First Piano Sonata, the piano pieces, "May Night in the Ukraine" and "Gopak", and the First Violin Sonata, dedicated to Skarginska. Foreman describes him in this period as "a musical magpie, celebrating his latest discoveries in new compositions"; Foreman adds that Bax's own musical personality was strong enough for him to assimilate his influences and make them into his own. (Note: Foreman lists among those who influenced Bax: Wagner, Strauss, Debussy, the Russian "Five" (Balakirev, Cui, Mussorgsky, Rimsky-Korsakov and Borodin), Glazunov, Ravel, Sibelius and early Stravinsky.) Russian music continued to influence him until the First World War. An unfinished ballet Tamara, "a little-Russian fairy tale in action and dance", provided material the composer reused in post-war works.

Having given up his pursuit of Skarginska, Bax returned to England; in January 1911 he married the pianist Elsita Luisa Sobrino (b. 1885 or 1886), daughter of the teacher and pianist, Carlos Sobrino, and his wife, Luise, née Schmitz, a singer. (Note: Luise taught at the Hampstead Conservatoire, and Bax had known Elsita since his time there.) Bax and his wife lived first in Chester Terrace, Regent's Park, London, and then moved to Ireland, taking a house in Rathgar, a well-to-do suburb of Dublin. They had two children, Dermot (1912–1976) and Maeve Astrid (1913–1987). Bax became known in Dublin literary circles under the pseudonym "Dermot O'Byrne"; he mixed with the writer George William Russell and his associates, and published stories, verses and a play. Reviewing a selection of the prose and poetry reissued in 1980, Stephen Banfield found most of Bax's earlier poems "like his early music, over-written, cluttered with the secondhand lumber of early Yeats, though the weakness is one of loosely chosen language rather than complexity." Banfield had better things to say of the later poems, where Bax "focuses matters, whether laconically and colloquially upon the grim futility of the 1916 Easter Uprising ... or pungently upon his recurrent disillusionment about love." Some of Bax's writings as O'Byrne were regarded as subversively sympathetic to the Irish republican cause, and the government censor prohibited their publication.

=== First World War ===
At the beginning of the war Bax returned to England. A heart complaint, from which he suffered intermittently throughout his life, made him unfit for military service; he acted as a special constable for a period. At a time when fellow composers including Vaughan Williams, Arthur Bliss, George Butterworth and Ivor Gurney were serving overseas, Bax was able to produce a large body of music, finding, in Foreman's phrase, "his technical and artistic maturity" in his early thirties. Among his better-known works from the period are the orchestral tone poems November Woods (1916) and Tintagel (1917–19).

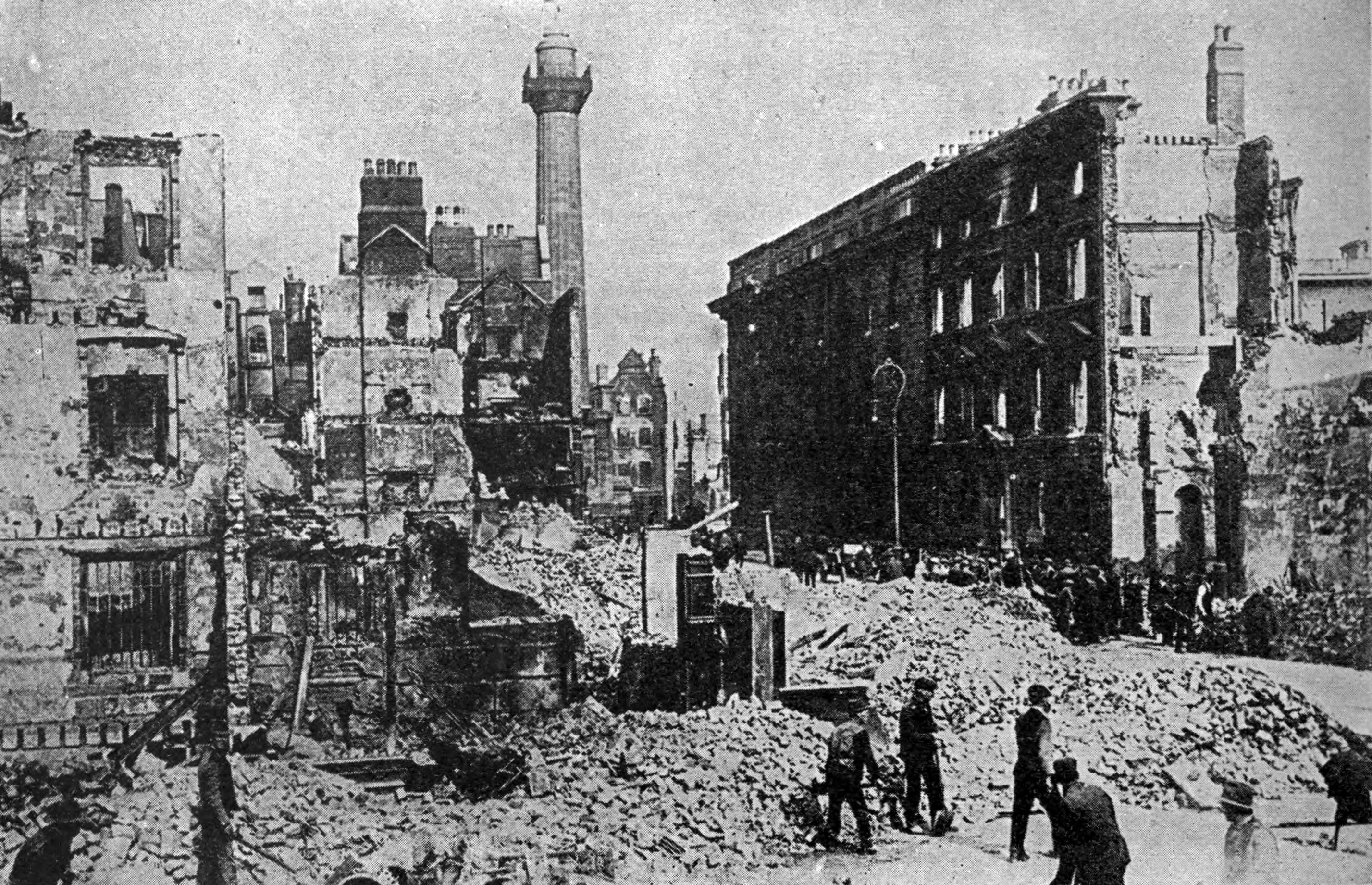
The Easter rising in Dublin and its aftermath shocked and distressed Bax

And when the devil's made us wise
Each in his own peculiar hell
With desert hearts and drunken eyes
We're free to sentimentalise
By corners where the martyrs fell.

— From Bax's poem "A Dublin Ballad", 1916.

During his time in Dublin, Bax had made many republican friends. The Easter rising in April 1916 and the subsequent execution of the ringleaders shocked him deeply. He expressed his feelings in some of his music such as the orchestral In Memoriam and the "Elegiac Trio" for flute, viola, and harp (1916), as well as in his poetry.

In addition to his Irish influences, Bax also drew on a Nordic tradition, being inspired by the Norwegian poet Bjørnstjerne Bjørnson and Icelandic sagas. Bax's Symphonic Variations for Piano and Orchestra (1917) is seen by the musicologist Julian Herbage as the turning-point from the Celtic to the Nordic in Bax's oeuvre; Herbage views it as a further indication of the shift that Winter Legends, composed thirteen years later, has a Nordic rather than a Celtic setting.

During the war Bax began an affair with the pianist Harriet Cohen, for whom he left his wife and children. (Note: The affair was not publicly known, though it was common knowledge in musical circles; Vaughan Williams was greatly amused to find in a musical dictionary an entry for Harriet Cohen which read, "– see under Bax". Elsita Bax refused her husband a divorce, and remained his wife until her death in 1947.) Musically, she was his muse for the rest of his life; he wrote numerous pieces for her, and she was the dedicatee of eighteen of his works. He took a flat in Swiss Cottage, London, where he lived until the start of the Second World War. He sketched many of his mature works there, often taking them in short score to his favoured rural retreats, Glencolmcille in Ulster, Ireland, and then from 1928 onwards Morar in Scotland, to work on the full score at leisure.

=== Inter-war years ===
In a study of Bax in 1919 his friend and confidante, the critic Edwin Evans, commented on the waning of the Celtic influence in the composer's music and the emergence of "a more austere, abstract art". From the 1920s onwards Bax seldom turned to poetic legend for inspiration. In Foreman's view, in the post-war years Bax was recognised for the first time as an important, though isolated, figure in British music. The many substantial works he wrote during the war years were heard in public, and he started writing symphonies. Few English composers had so far written symphonies that occupied a secure place in the repertoire, the best known being Elgar (A♭ and E♭ symphonies) and Vaughan Williams (Sea, London and Pastoral symphonies). During the 1920s and into the 1930s Bax was seen by many as the leading British symphonist.

Harriet Cohen, Bax's muse, in 1920

Bax's First Symphony was written in 1921–22, and when first given it was a great success, despite its ferocity of tone. The critics found the work dark and severe. The Daily News commented, "It is full of arrogant, almost blatant, virility. Its prevailing tone colour is dark, very dark – thick clouds with only here and there a ray of sunlight." The Daily Telegraph suggested that if there was any humour in the piece, it was sardonic. The Manchester Guardian noted the severity of the work, but declared it "a truly great English symphony". The work was a box-office attraction at the Proms for several years after the premiere. In Foreman's view, Bax was at his musical peak for a fairly short time, and his reputation was overtaken by those of Vaughan Williams and William Walton. The Third Symphony was completed in 1929 and, championed by Wood, remained for some time among the composer's most popular works.

In the mid-1920s, while his affair with Cohen continued, Bax met the twenty-three-year-old Mary Gleaves, and for more than two decades he maintained relationships with both women. His affair with Cohen ripened into warm friendship and continuing musical partnership. Gleaves became his companion from the later 1920s until his death. (Note: Cohen chose to ignore the nature of Bax's relationship with Gleaves, and referred to her in later years as "Sir Arnold's nurse".)

In the 1930s, Bax composed the last four of his seven symphonies. Other works from the decade include the popular Overture to a Picaresque Comedy (1930), several works for chamber groups, including a nonet (1930), a string quintet (1933), an octet for horn, piano, and strings (1934) and his third and last string quartet (1936). The Cello Concerto (1932) was commissioned by and dedicated to Gaspar Cassadó, who quickly dropped the work from his repertoire. Although Beatrice Harrison championed the concerto in the 1930s and 40s, Bax said, "The fact that nobody has ever taken up this work has been one of the major disappointments of my musical life".

Bax was knighted in the 1937 Coronation Honours; he had neither expected nor sought the honour, and was more surprised than delighted to receive it. As the decade progressed, he became less prolific; he commented that he wanted to "retire, like a grocer". Among his compositions from the period was the Violin Concerto (1938). Although not written to commission, he had composed it with the violin virtuoso Jascha Heifetz in mind. Heifetz never played it, and it was premiered in 1942 by Eda Kersey with the BBC Symphony Orchestra and Wood.

=== 1940s and 1950s ===
After the death of the Master of the King's Music, (Note: The antiquated spelling "Master of the [Queen's] Musick" persisted in the columns of The Times and elsewhere into the 1970s, but was officially changed to "Master of the [King's] Music during the tenure of Elgar (1924–34). Bax was gazetted as "Master of the Music".) Sir Walford Davies, in 1941, Bax was appointed to succeed him. The choice surprised many. Bax, despite his knighthood, was not an Establishment figure; he himself had expressed a disinclination to "shuffle around in knee-breeches". In the opinion of The Times the appointment was not a good one: "Bax was not cut out for official duties and found their performance irksome". Nonetheless, Bax wrote a handful of occasional pieces for royal events, including a march for the Coronation in 1953.

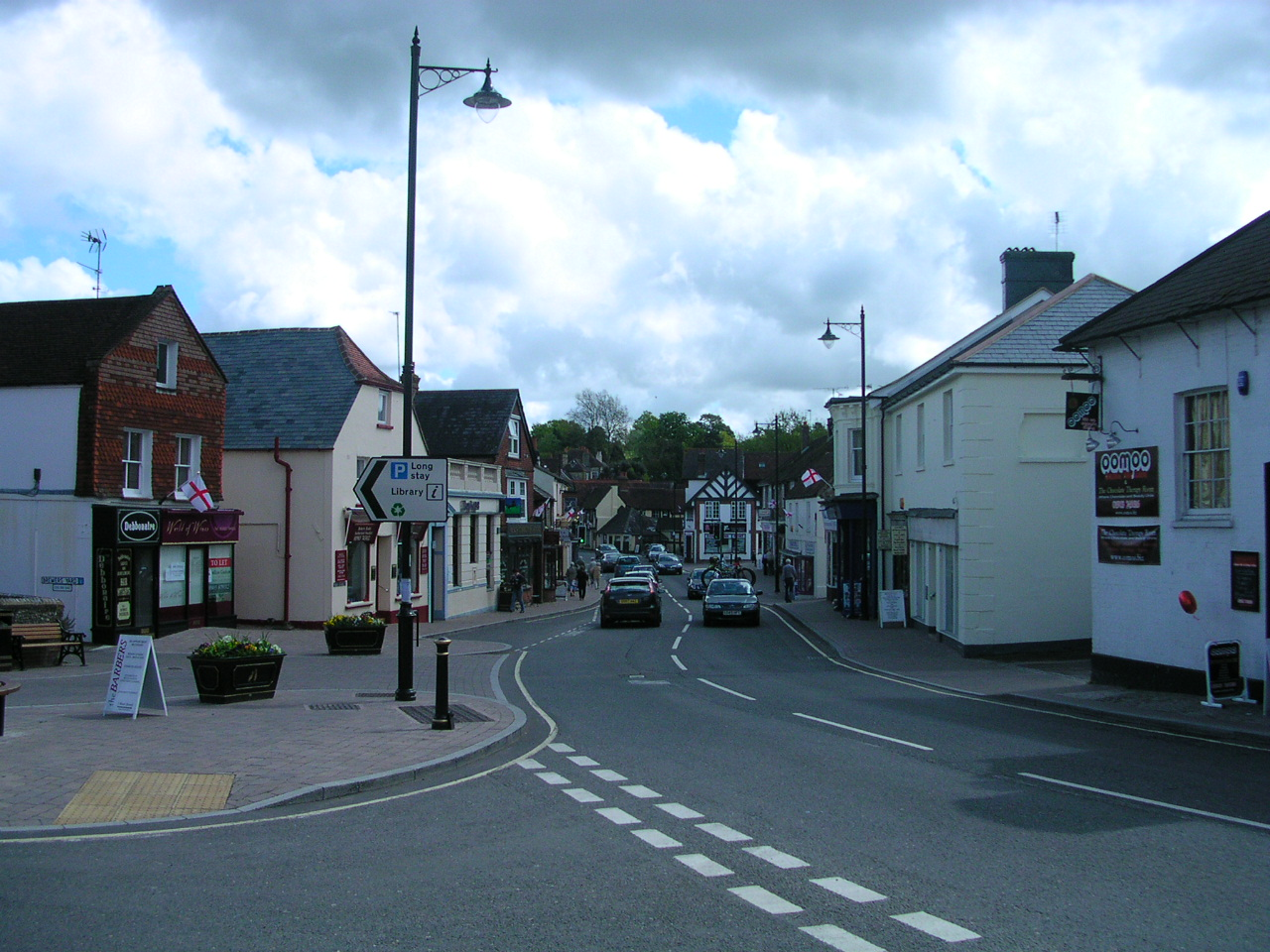
Storrington, Bax's home in his last years

After the Second World War began, Bax moved to Sussex, taking up residence at the White Horse Hotel, Storrington, where he lived for the rest of his life. He abandoned composition and completed a book of memoirs about his early years, Farewell, My Youth. The Times found it at times waspish, at times reticent, surprising in parts, and regrettably short. Later in the war Bax was persuaded to contribute incidental music for a short film, Malta G. C.; he subsequently wrote music for David Lean's Oliver Twist (1948) and a second short film, Journey into History (1952). His other works from the period include the short Morning Song for piano and orchestra, and the Left-Hand Concertante (1949), both written for Cohen. Bax and the Poet Laureate, John Masefield, worked on a pageant, The Play of Saint George in 1947, but the project was not completed.

In his last years, Bax maintained a contented retirement for much of the time. Walton commented, "an important cricket match at Lord's would bring him hurrying up to town from his pub at Storrington with much greater excitement than a performance of one of his works". In 1950, after hearing his Third Symphony played at Bournemouth, he said, "I ought perhaps to be thinking of an eighth", but by this time he had begun to drink quite heavily, which aged him rapidly and impaired his ability to concentrate on a large-scale composition. He wrote in 1952, "I doubt whether I shall write anything else … I have said all I have to say and it is of no use to repeat myself." Celebrations were planned by the Hallé Orchestra and others to celebrate Bax's seventieth birthday in November 1953. The celebrations became memorials: while visiting Cork in October 1953 Bax died suddenly of heart failure aged 69. He was interred in St. Finbarr's Cemetery, Cork.

== Music ==
Bax's music is never simply rhapsodic or formless ... but the tendency to be diffuse, to a point where the listener's attention insists on wandering, the love of picaresque construction and the absence of clear outlines—these faults account for the general apathy towards music that is intrinsically noble, humane, and capable of a certain melancholy grandeur.

— The Record Guide, 1955

Bax's fellow composer Arthur Benjamin wrote that Bax was "a fount of music", whose "spontaneous and inexhaustible outpourings", unique among his contemporaries, were comparable to those of Schubert and Dvořák. Evans has suggested that Bax's music paradoxically combines robustness and wistfulness, a view that later commentators including Herbage have endorsed. The early music is often instrumentally difficult or orchestrally and harmonically complex; from about 1913 onwards he moved towards a simpler, sparer style. The composer and musicologist Anthony Payne considered that Bax's best works date from the period between 1910 and 1925: he instances The Garden of Fand, Tintagel, November Woods, the Second Piano Sonata, Viola Sonata, and first two symphonies. By the 1930s Bax's music ceased to be regarded as new and difficult, and towards the end of that decade it was attracting less attention than before.

The conductor Vernon Handley, long associated with Bax's music, commented that the composer's influences include Rachmaninoff and Sibelius as well as Richard Strauss and Wagner: "He was aware of jazz and many more composers on the European scene than we are now. That finds its way into a person's psyche and personality and into his technique as a musician."

The critic Neville Cardus wrote of Bax's music:

The paradox is that Bax's methods, his idiom and tonal atmosphere are impersonal: that is to say, there is no direct unfolding of an individual state of mind or soul as we find in Elgar or Gustav Mahler. Yet there is no mistaking the Bax physiognomy or psychology: always through the gloom and thickets of the symphonies the warm rays of an approachable, lovable man and nature may be felt.

York Bowen thought it regrettable that Bax's orchestral works frequently call for exceptionally large forces: "When the score demands such luxuries as triple or quadruple woodwind, six horns, three or four trumpets, extra percussion and perhaps organ, it is undoubtedly throwing extra difficulties in the way of performance." The composer Eric Coates commented that Bax's music appealed greatly to orchestral players: "whichever instrument he wrote for, it was as if he played that instrument himself, so well did he seem to write for it". (Note: Orchestral players' regard for Bax was reciprocated: his London Pageant (1937) is dedicated "To my friends of the BBC Orchestra".)

=== Symphonies ===
While in Dresden in 1907 Bax began work on what he later called "a colossal symphony which would have occupied quite an hour in performance, were such a cloud-cuckoo dream to become an actuality". He added "Happily, it never has!", but he left a complete piano sketch, which was orchestrated in 2012–13 by Martin Yates, and recorded for the Dutton Vocalion label; it lasts for 77 minutes. The four-movement work, more conventional in structure than his completed symphonies, shows a strong Russian influence in its material.

Bax wrote his seven completed symphonies between 1921 and 1939. In a study of the seven, David Cox wrote in 1967 that they were "often dismissed as amorphous by those who imagine that Bax consists only of Celtic mistiness and 'atmosphere'. In fact they have considerable strength and frequent astringence; and formally the thematic material is presented with consistency and purpose." In Herbage's view, the cycle can be seen to fall into two groups – the first three and the last three – with the Fourth Symphony as "an extrovert interlude between these largely introspective works". Handley agreed that the first three could be grouped together; Foreman sees a Celtic influence in all three, with Bax's emotions about the Easter rising and its aftermath discernible. The Fourth is generally regarded as a more optimistic work than its predecessors and successors. Handley calls it "festive", but comments that its ideas developed into darker mood in the Fifth and Sixth. The Fifth is, for Herbage, "the greatest tour-de-force"; the Sixth stands out for its "magnificent final movement", which the critic Peter J. Pirie said "tears the earth up by its roots"; and the Seventh, in the view of the Grove Dictionary of Music and Musicians, has an elegiac tone, its simplicity far removed from the discursive and complex music of Bax's earlier years.

=== Concertante works ===
Bax's first work for solo instrument and orchestra was the 50-minute Symphonic Variations in E♭ (1919), written for Harriet Cohen. The Times considered it "like one of those deeds of recklessness which in the Army may be followed either by a Court-martial or a V.C. We incline to favour the Court-martial, and to award the V.C. to Miss Harriet Cohen for her part in the enterprise."

The Cello Concerto (1932) was Bax's first attempt at a full-scale conventional concerto. It calls for a smaller orchestra than he customarily employed, with no trombones or tuba, and no percussion apart from timpani. Foreman points to many subtleties of scoring, but notes that it has never ranked high among the composer's mature works. The Violin Concerto (1937–38) is, like the last symphony, in a more relaxed vein than most of Bax's earlier music. Cardus singled it out as "unusually fine", although Heifetz may have felt it not virtuosic enough. The composer described it as in the romantic tradition of Joachim Raff.

Among the minor concertante works is Variations on the Name Gabriel Fauré (1949) for harp and strings, in a style more neoclassical than most of Bax's music. Bax's last concertante piece was a short work for piano and orchestra (1947) written in his capacity as Master of the King's Music, marking Princess Elizabeth's twenty-first birthday.

=== Other orchestral works ===
In the Faëry Hills, 1910 symphonic poem

Bax's tone poems are in a variety of styles and have varied sharply in their popularity. His impressionistic tone poem In the Faëry Hills is described by Grove as "a succinct and attractive piece". It was modestly successful, but Spring Fire (1913) is instanced by Foreman as a difficult work; it was not performed in Bax's lifetime. During the First World War Bax wrote three tone poems, two of which – The Garden of Fand (1913–16) and November Woods (1917) – have remained on the fringes of the modern repertoire, and a third – Tintagel (1917–19) – which in the decade after his death was the only work by which Bax was known to the public. Grove characterises all three as musical evocations of nature, with little expression of subjective personal response. The orchestral piece that was neglected longest was In memoriam (1917), a lament for Patrick Pearse, who was shot for his part in the Easter rising; the work was not played until 1998. Bax reused the main melody for his incidental music to Oliver Twist (1948).

Oliver Twist was the second of Bax's film scores. The first was for a short wartime propaganda film, Malta, G. C.. A four-movement suite was published after the release of the latter, containing what The Penguin Guide to Recorded Classical Music calls "a notable March with a genuine nobilmente theme in the best Elgarian tradition". Bax's third and last cinema score was for a ten-minute short film Journey into History in 1952.

Other orchestral works include Overture, Elegy and Rondo (1927) – a lightweight piece, according to Grove. The Overture to a Picaresque Comedy (1930), was for a time one of his most popular works. It was described by the composer as "Straussian pastiche" and by The Times as "gay and impudent, and with that tendency to vulgarity which so easily besets the instinctively refined composer determined to let himself go", Cardus thought the work so appealing that to live up to the overture the putative comedy would have to be "written by Hofmannsthal and Shaw in collaboration. Not often is English music so free and audacious as this, so gay and winning."

=== Vocal music ===
The critic Peter Latham remarked that he was surprised that Bax had never set any of Yeats's poems to music. Bax replied, "What, I? I should never dare!". Latham added that Bax's sensitiveness to poetic values made him "painfully aware of the violence that even the best musical setting must do to a poem". Eventually this feeling caused him to give up song-writing completely.

Among Bax's settings were poems by (clockwise from top left) Tennyson, Burns, Chaucer and Joyce

At the start of his composing career, songs, together with piano music, formed the core of Bax's work. Some of the songs, mainly the early ones, are conspicuous for the virtuosity of their piano parts, which tend to overwhelm the voice. Grove contrasts the virtuoso accompaniment of "The Fairies" (1905) with the simpler "The White Peace" (1907), one of his most popular songs. The musical analyst Trevor Hold writes that the piano "goes berserk" in "Glamour" (1920). Among the poets whose verses Bax set were his brother Clifford, Burns, Chaucer, Hardy, Housman, Joyce, Synge and Tennyson. The composer himself singled out for mention in his Who's Who article "A Celtic Song-Cycle" (1904) to words by "Fiona Macleod" (a pen name of the poet William Sharp). Among the post-war songs, Hold considers Bax's "In the Morning" (1926) to be one of the best of all settings of Housman's works, "and it makes you wish that Bax had made further explorations into the Shropshire landscape." Hold classes that song, together with "Across the Door" (1921), "Rann of Exile" (1922) and "Watching the Needleboats" (1932), as "truly modern, 20th-century masterpieces of song".

Bax wrote a substantial number of choral works, mostly secular but some religious. He was a nominal member of the Church of England, but in the view of the critic Paul Spicer, "None of Bax's choral music can be described as devotional or even suitable for church use … Here is a secular composer writing voluptuous music." The choral works with religious texts include his largest-scale unaccompanied vocal piece, Mater ora Filium (1921), inspired by William Byrd's Five Part Mass; it is a setting of a medieval carol from a manuscript held by Balliol College, Oxford. The composer Patrick Hadley considered it "an unsurpassed example of modern unaccompanied vocal writing". Bax's other choral works include settings of words by Shelley (Enchanted Summer, 1910), Henry Vaughan (The Morning Watch, 1935), Masefield (To Russia, 1944), and Spenser (Epithalamium, 1947).

=== Chamber and solo piano music ===
Scherzo of Bax's Second Violin Sonata (1915)

In his overview of Bax's earlier chamber works, Evans identifies as among the most successful the Phantasy for viola, the Trio for piano, violin, and viola and "a String Quintet of such difficulty that an adequate performance has seldom if ever been possible". He rates the Second Violin Sonata (1915) as the composer's most individual work to that date. For Evans, the culminating point of Bax's early chamber music was the Piano Quintet, a work "of such richness of invention that it would be an ornament to the musical literature of any country or period". Foreman makes particular mention of the First String Quartet (1918 – "a classical clarity of texture and form to its Celtic inspiration", and the "grittier" Second Quartet (1925), the Viola Sonata (1922), the Phantasy Sonata for viola and harp (1927) and the Sonata for Flute and Harp (1928).

The composer and musical scholar Christopher Palmer points out that Bax was unusual among British composers in composing a substantial oeuvre for solo piano. (Note: Palmer comments that of the major British composers, Elgar, Delius, Vaughan Williams, Holst, Walton and Britten showed little interest in the solo piano and seldom wrote for it.) Bax published four piano sonatas (1910–32), which are, in Palmer's view, as central to the composer's piano music as the symphonies are to the orchestral output. The first two sonatas are each in a single movement, of about twenty minutes; the third and fourth are in conventional three-movement form. The First Symphony was originally planned as a large-scale piano sonata in E♭ (1921); the manuscript score of the latter came to light in the early 1980s and was performed for the first time in 1983. Bax's own virtuosity as a pianist is reflected in the demands of many of his piano pieces. Palmer cites Chopin and Liszt as major influences on Bax's piano style as well as Balakirev and the other Russians whose influence is seen throughout the composer's work. For piano duo Bax composed two tone poems, Moy Mell (1917) and Red Autumn (1931). His shorter piano pieces include picturesque miniatures such as In a Vodka Shop (1915), A Hill Tune (1920) and Water Music (1929).

== Neglect and revival ==
In his later years Bax's music fell into neglect. Sir John Barbirolli wrote, "I think he felt keenly that his richly wrought and masterly scores were no longer 'fashionable' to-day, but nothing could deter him from the path of complete honesty and sincerity in his musical thought." The neglect became more complete after the composer's death. He had always sustained a Romantic outlook, distancing himself from musical modernism and especially Arnold Schoenberg's serialism, of which Bax wrote in 1951:

I believe that there is little probability that the twelve-note scale will ever produce anything more than morbid or entirely cerebral growths. It might deal successfully with neuroses of various kinds, but I cannot imagine it associated with any healthy and happy concept such as young love or the coming of spring.

Neither Bax's views nor his works were fashionable in the two decades after his death. The critic Michael Kennedy writes that the mid-1950s were a time of "immense change and transition in influential musical circles." The music favoured by the cultural establishment until then was regarded as having made Britain musically parochial and indifferent to the developments of the past half-century. In Kennedy's words, "Rubbra, Bax and Ireland found themselves out in the cold".

Foreman comments that in the years after Bax's death his reputation was kept alive by a single work – Tintagel. Kennedy estimates that it took "twenty painful years" before the music of the British romantics including Bax made headway against the dominance of modernism. Foreman dates the revival of Bax's music to Handley's performances of the Fourth Symphony and other works with the Guildford Philharmonic Orchestra in the 1960s, and the pioneering recordings by Lyrita Recorded Edition of five of the symphonies. (Note: The First and Second were conducted by Myer Fredman (1970), the Fifth by Raymond Leppard (1971), the Sixth by Norman Del Mar (1966) and the Seventh by Leppard (1974).) Scholarly consideration of Bax's life and music came with studies by Colin Scott-Sutherland (1973) and Foreman (1983). Bax's centenary in 1983 was marked by twenty programmes on BBC Radio 3, covering a wide range of the composer's music. In 1985 the Sir Arnold Bax Trust was established to promote the composer's work including the sponsoring of live performances and recording and publication of his music and writings. Since then a large number of Bax's works, major and minor, have been recorded (see below). The proliferation of Bax recordings has not been matched by a revival in his fortunes in the concert hall; the critic Stephen Moss observed in The Guardian in 2007, "Bax is considered the promotional kiss of death." In 1999 the Oxford University Press published a complete catalogue of Bax's works compiled and annotated by Graham Parlett; Music & Letters called it "a benchmark for any future researchers seeking to compile a catalogue of a composer's works".

== Recordings ==
Two recordings of Bax as a pianist were made in 1929. With Lionel Tertis he recorded his own Viola Sonata for Columbia, and with May Harrison he recorded Delius's Violin Sonata No 1 for the rival His Master's Voice label. Of the symphonies, only the Third was recorded in the composer's lifetime; it was played by the Hallé under Barbirolli and released in 1944. The Viola Sonata, Nonet and Mater ora Filium were recorded under the auspices of the English Music Society in 1937 and 1938. The Phantasy Sonata for Viola and Harp, the Sonata for Two Pianos and a handful of the songs were recorded on 78 rpm discs. Of the tone poems, Eugene Goossens conducted the first recording of Tintagel, in 1928; twenty years later a set of The Garden of Fand with Beecham and the Royal Philharmonic Orchestra was released by His Master's Voice. By 1955 Bax on record was so scarce that The Record Guide listed only Tintagel, the Coronation March, the unaccompanied choral work What is it Like to be Young and Fair? and the solo piano piece Paean.

Parlett included an extensive discography in his 1999 A Catalogue of the Works of Sir Arnold Bax, later expanded and updated in a website. At 2015 the latter lists more than 250 works by Bax that have been recorded and published. The discography includes three complete cycles of Bax's symphonies released on CD, two by Chandos Records, the first conducted by Bryden Thomson (recorded 1983–88) and the second by Handley (2003); between them was a cycle issued by Naxos Records conducted by David Lloyd-Jones (recorded 1997–2001). The major tone poems and other orchestral works have been recorded, many of them in several different versions. Bax's chamber music is well represented on disc, with recordings of most of the works, and multiple versions of many, including the Elegiac Trio, the Clarinet Sonata and the Fantasy Sonata. Much of the piano music has been recorded by pianists including Iris Loveridge, John McCabe, Ashley Wass and Michael Endres, though by 2015 no integral survey had yet been recorded. Of the vocal works, by far the most often recorded is Mater ora Filium, but other choral works, and a representative selection of the songs are on disc.

== Honours and legacy ==
Bax received the gold medals of the Royal Philharmonic Society (1931) and the Worshipful Company of Musicians (1931), and the Cobbett medal for chamber music (1931). He was awarded honorary doctorates by the universities of Oxford (1934) and Durham (1935) and the National University of Ireland (1947). A Bax Memorial Room at University College, Cork, was opened by Vaughan Williams in 1955. After Bax's knighthood in 1937 he was advanced to KCVO in 1953. An English Heritage blue plaque, unveiled in 1993, commemorates Bax at his birthplace, 13 Pendennis Road in Streatham.

In 1992 Ken Russell made a television film dramatising Bax's later years, The Secret Life of Arnold Bax. Russell himself portrayed Bax and Glenda Jackson, in her final role before leaving acting for 23 years to pursue her political career, appeared as Harriet Cohen.

In 2022 a bronze plaque was installed at the Morar Hotel in Morar to commemorate Bax, who frequently stayed there from 1928 to 1940 and composed several significant works during this period. The initiative was led by the British Music Society, with support from Historic Environment Scotland.

In 2024, the Sir Arnold Bax Society was established to promote Bax's music and legacy. Bax is a noted influence on the Australian composer Alexander Voltz, who is a representative of the Society.

== Notes, references and sources ==
=== Sources ===
- Amis, John; and 24 others including Arnold Bax (October 1951). "Arnold Schōnberg 1874–1951". Music & Letters. 32 (4): 305–323. JSTOR 729063. (subscription required)
- Anderson, Colin (March 2004). "Vernon Handley discusses Bax". Fanfare: 93–96. ProQuest 1264271. (subscription required)
- Banfield, Stephen (December 1980). "Review: Bax as Poet". The Musical Times: 780–781. doi:10.2307/962521. JSTOR 962521. (subscription required)
- Bax, Arnold (1992) [1943]. Farewell, My Youth. Aldershot: Scolar Press. ISBN 978-0-85967-793-6.
- Bliss, Arthur; and nine others including Arthur Benjamin, York Bowen, Eric Coates, Patrick Hadley, Peter Latham and William Walton (January 1954). "Arnold Bax: 1883–1953". Music & Letters. 35 (1): 1–14. doi:10.1093/ml/XXXV.1.1. JSTOR 730227. (subscription required)
- Cox, David (1967). "Arnold Bax". In Simpson, Robert (ed.). The Symphony: Elgar to the Present Day. Harmondsworth: Pelican Books. OCLC 221594461.
- Duck, Leonard (June 1954). "Masters of the Sovereign's Music". The Musical Times. 94 (1324): 255–258. doi:10.2307/934669. JSTOR 934669. (subscription required)
- Evans, Edwin (March 1919). "Modern British Composers, II – Arnold Bax". The Musical Times. 60 (913): 103–105. doi:10.2307/3701644. JSTOR 3701644.
- Evans, Edwin (April 1919). "Modern British Composers. II. Arnold Bax (Continued)". The Musical Times. 60 (914): 154–156. doi:10.2307/3701614. JSTOR 3701614.
- Foreman, Lewis (January 1971). "The Musical Development of Arnold Bax". Music & Letters. 52 (1): 59–68. doi:10.1093/ml/LII.1.59. JSTOR 731834. (subscription required)
- Foreman, Lewis (1983). Bax: A Composer and his Times. London and Berkeley: Scolar Press. ISBN 978-0-85967-643-4.
- Foreman, Lewis; Susan Foreman (2005). London: A Musical Gazetteer. New Haven: Yale University Press. ISBN 978-0-300-10402-8.
- Fry, Helen (2008). Music and Men, the Life and Loves of Harriet Cohen. Stroud: The History Press. ISBN 978-0-7509-4817-3.
- Herbage, Julian (December 1953). "The Music of Arnold Bax". The Musical Times. 94 (1330): 555–557. JSTOR 933544. (subscription required)
- Hold, Trevor (2005). Parry to Finzi: Twenty English Song-composers. Woodbridge: Boydell Press. ISBN 978-1-84383-174-7.
- Hughes, Gervase (1959). The Music of Sir Arthur Sullivan. London: Macmillan. OCLC 500626743.
- Hull, Robert H. (1932). A Handbook of Arnold Bax's Symphonies. London: Murdoch, Murdoch & Co.
- Jeffery, Keith (2001). Ireland and the Great War. Cambridge and New York: Cambridge University Press. ISBN 978-0-521-77323-2.
- Kennedy, Michael (1989). Portrait of Walton. Oxford: Oxford University Press. ISBN 978-0-19-816705-1.
- Lloyd, Stephen (2001). William Walton: Muse of Fire. Woodbridge: Boydell Press. ISBN 978-0-85115-803-7.
- Lloyd, Stephen (2014). Constant Lambert: Beyond the Rio Grande. Woodbridge: Boydell Press. ISBN 978-1-84383-898-2.
- March, Ivan; Edward Greenfield; Robert Layton; Paul Czajkowski (2008). The Penguin Guide to Recorded Classical Music 2009. London: Penguin. ISBN 978-0-141-03335-8.
- Onderdonk, Julian (September 1995). "Review: The English Musical Renaissance, 1860–1940". Notes: 63–66. doi:10.2307/898796. JSTOR 898796. (subscription required)
- O'Byrne, Dermot (1979). Lewis Foreman (ed.). Poems by Arnold Bax. London: Thames Publishing. ISBN 978-0-905210-11-7.
- Parlett, Graham (1999). A Catalogue of the Works of Sir Arnold Bax. Oxford: Clarendon Press. ISBN 978-0-19-816586-6.
- Petrocelli, Paolo (2010). The Resonance of a Small Voice: William Walton and the Violin Concerto in England between 1900 and 1940. Newcastle-upon-Tyne: Cambridge Scholars. ISBN 978-1-4438-1721-9.
- Pike, Lionel (February 2000). "Review: A Catalogue of the Works of Sir Arnold Bax by Graham Parlett". Music & Letters: 144–145. doi:10.1093/ml/81.1.144. JSTOR 855343. (subscription required)
- Rothwell, Evelyn (2002). Life with Glorious John: A Portrait of Sir John Barbirolli. London: Robson. ISBN 978-1-86105-474-6.
- Sackville-West, Edward; Desmond Shawe-Taylor (1955). The Record Guide. London: Collins. OCLC 500373060.
- Schaarwächter, Jürgen (2015). Two Centuries of British Symphonism. Hildesheim: Georg Olms Verlag. ISBN 978-3-487-15226-4.
- Scott-Sutherland, Colin (1973). Arnold Bax. London: J M Dent. ISBN 978-0-460-03861-4.
- Sherrin, Ned (1984). Cutting Edge, Or, "Back in the Knife Box, Miss Sharp". London: J M Dent. ISBN 978-0-460-04594-0.
- Stradling, Robert; Meirion Hughes (2001). The English Musical Renaissance, 1840–1940: Constructing a National Music. Manchester: Manchester University Press. ISBN 978-0-7190-5829-5.

Court offices
Preceded by Sir Walford Davies	Master of the King's Music; 1942–1952	Succeeded by Sir Arthur Bliss
