= Lewis Foreman =

British author and musicologist (born 1941)

Lewis Foreman (born 1941) is a musicologist and author of books, articles, programme notes and CD sleeve notes on classical music, specialising in British music. He has been particularly associated with the Dutton Epoch and Lyrita record labels and with the British Music Society. His biography of Arnold Bax, now (2024) in its third edition, was first published in 1983. He writes obituaries of composers and music record executives for The Independent. He is also a contributor to Grove Music Online.

Foreman qualified as a librarian in 1964, and after a period developing the music library holdings at Ealing Central Library he became a government librarian – head of bibliographic services with HMSO – until 1982. He continued as a civil servant, including time at the Department of Trade and Industry, until 1997, when he retired to devote his energies to musical activities full time. In 2005 he completed a PhD at Cardiff University with the musicologist John Tyrrell. The same year Trinity College of Music awarded him an honorary fellowship.

Foreman has been the discoverer and performance facilitator of many previously forgotten or lost scores by British composers, including the reconstruction of performance materials, and he has worked with conductors, professional (and sometimes amateur) ensembles, music trusts, publishers, broadcasters and record labels to promote and secure recordings, often world premiere recordings. He has written over 30 books, including several with his wife Susan Foreman, who died in 2023. He lives in Rickmansworth, from where he ran the Triad Press, and the Sir Arnold Bax Trust for many decades.

== Selected publications ==
- Havergal Brian: a collection of essays, ed. (Triad Press, 1969)
- The British Musical Renaissance: a guide to research (1972)
- Systematic Discography (1974)
- British Music Now, ed. (1975)
- Edmund Rubbra: composer, ed. (Triad Press, 1977)
- Arthur Bliss: catalogue of the complete works (1980)
- The Percy Grainger Companion, ed. (1981)
- Bax: a composer and his times (1983, revised 1988 and 2007)
- Music in England, 1885-1920: as recounted in Hazell's Annual, ed. (1986)
- From Parry to Britten: British music in letters (1987)
- Lost and Only Sometimes Found: a seminar on music publishing and archives, ed. (1992)
- Oh My Horses! Elgar and the Great War, ed. (2001)
- London: a musical gazetteer (2005) (with Susan Foreman)
- The John Ireland Companion, ed. (2011)
- Armstrong Gibbs: a countryman born and bred (2014) (with Angela Aries)
- The Cyril Scott Companion (2018) (with Desmond Scott and Leslie De'Ath)
- Felix Aprahamian Diaries and Selected Writings on Music, ed. (2023) (with Susan Foreman)
- Recording British Music: a personal history of fifty years researching and recording neglected repertoire (2024)
