= Hatstand, Table and Chair =

Group of three sculptures by Allen Jones

Chair, Hatstand and Table, illustrated for Christie's auction in 2013

Hatstand, Table and Chair are a group of three erotic sculptures by British pop artist Allen Jones, created in 1969 and first exhibited in 1970. They have been described in retrospect as "emblematic of the spirit of the 1960s" and an "international sensation." At the time they were met with angry protests, particularly from feminists who saw them as an objectification of women.

== Description ==
Hatstand, Table and Chair are three fibreglass sculptures of women transformed into items of furniture. They are each dressed with wigs and are naked apart from their corsets, gloves and leather boots. Each is slightly larger than life-size. For Chair, the woman lies curled on her back, a seat cushion on her thighs, and her legs acting as a backrest. Table is a woman on all fours, with a sheet of glass supported on her back. For Hat Stand the woman is standing 1.85 metres (73 in) tall, her hands upturned as hooks.

Each fiberglass figure was produced from drawings by Jones. He oversaw a professional sculptor, Dick Beech, who produced the figures in clay. The three female figures were then cast by a model company, Gems Wax Models Ltd, which specialized in producing shop mannequins. Each figure was produced in an edition of six.

Jones explained that they were not illustrations of scenes, but rather that "the figure is a device for a painting or a sculpture. It’s not a portrayal of someone – it’s a psychological construction."

== Background ==
Allen Jones was one of the first of the 1960s British pop artists and produced paintings and prints. A 1968 set of prints, In Life Class, has been cited as an immediate predecessor of his chair, table, and hatstand. Each print is made of two halves, the bottom being a pair of women's legs in tights, the upper halves drawn in a 1940s fetishist graphic style, representing "the secret face of British male desire in the gloomy post-war years". Jones enjoyed combining different visual languages to expose the historical constructions underlying them. He examined the cultural representations of the female body.

At the time of his 70th birthday Jones gave an explanation of his motives for creating the sculptures:

"I was living in Chelsea and I had an interest in the female figure and the sexual charge that comes from it. Every Saturday on the King's Road you went out and skirts were shorter, the body was being displayed in some new way. And you knew that the following week somebody would up the ante... I was reflecting on and commenting on exactly the same situation that was the source of the feminist movement. It was unfortunate for me that I produced the perfect image for them to show how women were being objectified."

== Aftermath ==
The sculptures were exhibited in 1970 and met with an outcry from feminists, who objected to women being made into items of furniture. The Guardian newspaper suggested the works should be banned from exhibition. Spare Rib magazine suggested the sculptures showed that Jones was terrified of women.

Jones was contacted by film director Stanley Kubrick with a view to creating similar sculptures for his new film, A Clockwork Orange. Jones turned down the request because no payment was offered. However, he gave Kubrick permission to use the idea and sculptures reminiscent of his work in the film's Korova Milk Bar scene.

According to art historian and curator Marco Livingstone, writing in 2004:

"More than three decades later, these works still carry a powerful emotive charge, ensnaring every viewer's psychology and sexual outlook regardless of age, gender or experience. But a few moments of reflection should make it obvious that these works are manifestations of fantasy and the imagination, and that they poke fun at male expectations."

The 2008 music video for "No Can Do" by Sugababes was inspired by Jones' 1970 Chair sculpture and features the group using men as objects such as cars, motorcycles and bridges.

A set of the sculptures was purchased by German playboy, Gunter Sachs, at the time of their release. His set was sold in 2012 at a Sotheby's auction for £2.6 million. In the wake of this, another set came to market in February 2013, selling at Christie's for £2.2 million.

In a 2025 interview Jones admitted for the first time that the artwork had "hampered" his career. He says it was not until 2016 that a journalist interviewed him without asking about Hatstand, though even she rang again later on instructions of her editor to ask the question.

=== 2014 parody ===
In 2014, a reinterpretation of Jones's Chair by Norwegian artist Bjarne Melgaard, using a mannequin of a Black woman, created fresh controversy. Images of the chair on the fashion website Buro 24/7 were met with accusations of racism when they showed a white woman, Dasha Zhukova, sitting on the seat. Melgaard's Chair was part of a collection of sculptures exhibited under the name Allen Jones Remake at the Venus Over Manhattan gallery, New York, in 2013.

== See also ==
- Human furniture
- Nyotaimori
