= Human furniture =

Practice in which a person's body is used as furniture

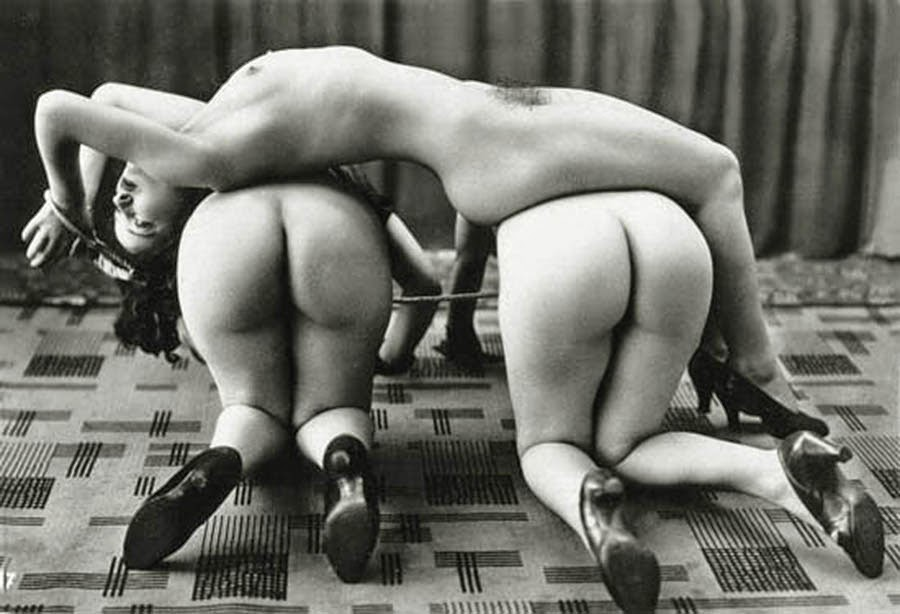
A nude woman posing as a decorative table (top). A human table, formed using three nude women (bottom).

Human furniture is furniture in which a person's body is used as a tray, foot stool, chair, table, cabinet or other item. In some cases a sculpture of a human body is used instead. Examples of human furniture have appeared in modern art. Forniphilia is the paraphilia relating to human furniture, including that seen in fetish photography and bondage pornography.

== Art ==
A model used as human furniture may be nude or semi-nude to add to the erotic or aesthetic appeal. A classic example of the depiction of human furniture as art is the set of three sculptures Hatstand, Table and Chair made in 1969 by British pop artist Allen Jones which show semi-naked white women in the roles of furniture. Allen Jones' artwork was the subject of a feminist protest when it was auctioned at Sotheby's in 2012.

Norwegian artist Bjarne Melgaard created a sculpture called Chair which has the same shape as the Allen Jones' chair but depicts a black woman. In 2014 art collector Dasha Zhukova, the partner of Russian billionaire Roman Abramovich, caused controversy by appearing in a photograph sitting on Melgaard's chair. Zhukova apologized for the photograph saying that she "utterly abhor[s] racism, and would like to apologise to anyone who has been offended by this image".

The Japanese fetish artist Namio Harukawa depicted voluptuous women, who dominated men and used them as human furniture.

In 2025, Bianca Censori debuted bondage females as human furniture in South Korea, which was praised by her husband and artist Kanye West.

== Bondage ==
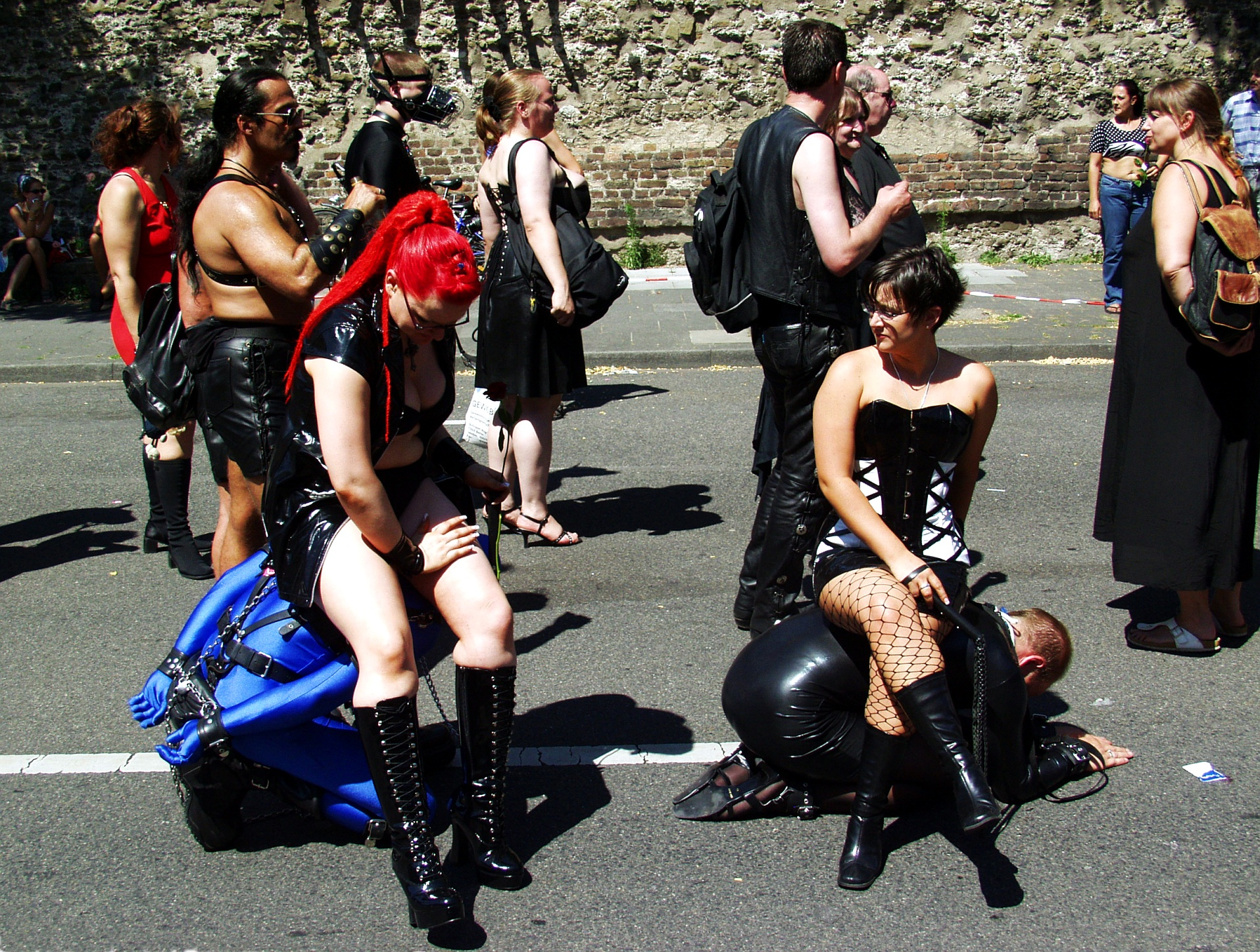
Dominatrices sitting on submissive males by using them as chairs, Cologne Pride, 2006

The term forniphilia was coined by bondage artist Jeff Gord who specialized in the subgenre and maintained the website "House of Gord" on the subject. Forniphilia as a form of bondage usually involves the subject being tightly bound and expected to stay immobile for a prolonged period. Gord said that the maximum period he used depended on the bondage techniques involved but it did not generally exceed two hours. Gord also warned that the dangers inherent in forniphilia meant that it should only be carried out by experts. Gord used gags in some of his creations. A forniphilic gag is a type of gag that has the primary purpose of sexual objectification or erotic humiliation. Proper safety requires frequent checks of the submissive's well-being.

== In fiction ==
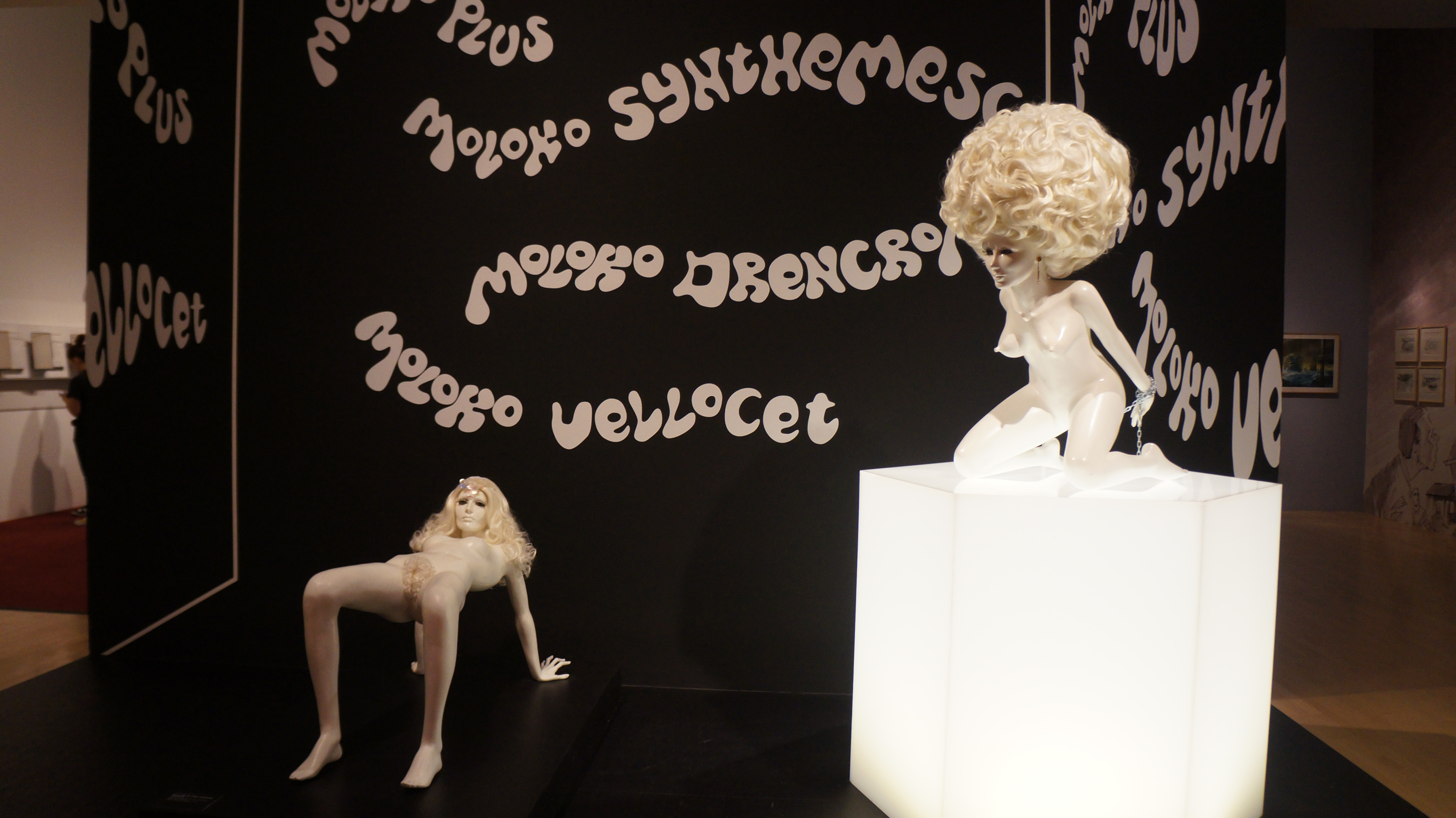
Human furniture from A Clockwork Orange

The 1971 film A Clockwork Orange includes a scene of a gang sitting in a room furnished with tables shaped like nude women.

In Episode 7 of the 2021 Netflix Original Korean Drama, Squid Game, the anonymous VIPs invited to watch the show's blood sport are surrounded by human furniture, which are seen wearing elaborate body paint.

== See also ==
- Animal roleplay
- Erotic furniture
- Erotic humiliation
- Facesitting
- Nyotaimori, the practice of consuming food placed on a naked woman's body
- Sexual fetishism
- Sexual objectification
