= The xartcollection =

Some of the Multiples of the original xartcollection including Allen Jones, Richard Hamilton, Joe Tilson, Sandro Bocola, Max Bill, Pierre Haubensack and Getulio Alviani

The xartcollection was created in 1968 in Zollikofen, Zurich, Switzerland by Sandro Bocola and three partners: Heinz Bütler, Rolf Fehlbaum and Erwin Meierhofer.

Xartcollection's concept was to industrially produce three-dimensional “Multiples” in limited and signed editions. The company's philosophy was to make contemporary Art available to a large public and its “Multiples” were sold worldwide in art galleries, design- and furniture stores namely at “Wohnbedarf” in Switzerland.

Internationally renowned artists such as Max Bill, Getulio Alviani, Richard Hamilton (artist), Allen Jones (sculptor), Joe Tilson, Peter Phillips (artist) and others participated in this project. Most of xartcollection's "Multiples" were produced by the firm of Reif, Relo-Kunststoffe in Lörrach, Germany. In 1971 xartcollection also created "Xart Walls" which industrially produced wallpapers designed by known artists such as Jean Tinguely, Niki de Saint Phalle. The "Xart Walls" where manufactured by the firm "Marburg Wallcoverings" in Kirchhain, Germany.

Despite its international reputation the company went bankrupt and was dissolved in 1973.

== Exhibitions ==
- 1969 Xartcollection Multiples, Beylerian Gallery, New York City
- 1969 Xartcollection, Galerie Ursula Lichter, Frankfurt am Main
- 1969 Xartcollection Multiples, Bruno Bischofberger Gallery, Zürich
- 1969 [serigrafien verschiedener künstler und objekte der xartcollection] at Stoll Wohnbedarf, Köln
- 1970 "Multiple Art" Marlborough Gallery, New York City
- 1970 "New Multiple Art" at the White Chapel Art Gallery, London
- 1970 "xartcollection" stand at the Art Basel, Switzerland
- 1970 [unknown Exhibitiontitle] at Ben Wagins Galerie S, West-Berlin
- 1970 "Xartcollection 1971" at Galerie G, Basel
- 1971 "Multiples - the first decade" Philadelphia Museum of Art, Philadelphia
- 1973 "xart collection - xart wall" at Stoll Wohnbedarf, Köln
- 1974 "Multiples" Neuer Berliner Kunstverein, Berlin
- 1975 "multipels xartcollection" Stoll Wohnbedarf, Köln
- 1992 "Three or More" - Multiplied Art from Duchamp to the present - Wacoal Art Center of Spiral Garden, Tokyo
