= Joseph Dufresse Chang =

Singaporean educator (1927–2021)

Joseph Dufresse Chang FMS
- 张世典

Personal life
- Born: 21 November 1927 Beijing, Republic of China
- Died: 4 July 2021 (aged 93) Singapore

Religious life
- Religion: Catholic Church
- Profession: 1948
- Ordination: 1953

Joseph Dufresse Chang She Dien FMS (Chinese: 张世典; 21 November 1927 – 4 July 2021) was a Chinese-born Singaporean Catholic educator. He arrived in the country in 1950 and began teaching at the Catholic High School. He was appointed the school's headmaster in 1960, and continued to serve in this post until 1974.

== Early life and education ==
Chang was born in Beijing, China, on 21 November 1927. His family had been Catholic for several generations. He graduated from Tsinghua University. In 1940, he joined the Juniorate of the Marist Brothers there. He entered the Novitiate in 1947, making his first profession the year after and entering the Scholasticate in 1948. He fled to Hong Kong and Macau in the late 1940s to escape the Communists and in 1949, he left for the United States, where he completed his Bachelor of Arts degree and learnt to speak French. His perpetual vows were professed in 1953.

== Career ==
Chang arrived in Singapore in 1951 and began teaching at the primary school section of the Catholic High School (CHS), a boys' school which taught in both English and Chinese which had come under the Marist Brothers' leadership by 1950. The school "thrived" in this period, with the Maris Stella High School being established in 1958 to complement the institution. He was the homeroom teacher to a sixth-grade class, and taught the subjects Ethics and Bible Studies. He also organised a harmonica group, an orchestra and a brass band. His frequent "encouragement of students to engage in artistic activities" was seen as a significant aspect of his teaching style.

In 1960, he was appointed the principal of CHS, succeeding Brother Marcellin Sheng, whose tenure as headmaster had been brief. Sheng, who had only assumed the post the year before, had resigned due to his involvement in a road accident that had led to the death of Brother Liang Houxiang; he had been driving three Brothers of the school to Port Dickson while on holiday when heavy rain caused him to crash into a ditch in Muar, resulting in the drowning of Liang, who had fallen asleep in the car. The school's board of directors then appointed Chang as Sheng's successor as an "emergency decision".

As the headmaster, Chang had a "key role in turning [CHS] into one of the best Chinese-medium schools." He was known to have "vigorously promoted" the school's extracurricular activities in the arts, such as the brass band, choir and orchestra. He would perform with the groups as the piano accompaniment to "encourage [them] to learn sheet music well". Choo Thiam Siew, a student under Chang who would go on to head the Nanyang Academy of Fine Arts, recalled that Chang allowed members of the brass band and orchestra to bring the school's instruments home to practice as the students often came from less fortunate backgrounds and could not afford to buy their own instruments. He was successful in raising about $500,000 to upgrade the infrastructure at the CHS premises, which were then desperately in need of an expansion. By his retirement, Chang had become the second longest-serving headmaster of the school and the first since founder Yao Kwok Wah, who was principal for just one year more than Chang, stepped down in 1950 and handed the school over to the Marist Brothers.

Lee Hsien Loong, the son of Prime Minister Lee Kuan Yew and himself a future Prime Minister, attended CHS under Chang. Lee later recalled that Chang was "strict" yet "caring" with the students, and that he would often personally check up on their living conditions. Journalist Lim Jim Koon opined that he "struck a good balance between strictness and leniency" in teaching. Lim noted that Chang gave students "free rein" in extracurricular activities, which "flourished" in his time. Other students of CHS under Chang's tenure as principal included architect Chng Beng Guan, cardiologist Lim Yean Leng, artist Chua Ek Kay, real estate developer Daniel Teo, singer Cai Cheng and pianist Ong Lip Tat. Ong recalled that, when he was 15, Chang organised a solo recital for him; at the end of the event, he received a souvenir from Kwa Geok Choo, the wife of Lee Kuan Yew. He credited Chang with "[helping] him gain confidence" by allowing him to form the national anthem, Majulah Singapura, during assemblies and concerts. Additionally, Chang helped Ong in winning a scholarship to study in the United Kingdom and personally saw him off at the airport. According to Lim Yean Leng, he remains "the most respected headmaster Catholic High School has ever had till this day."

Chang stepped down as principal of CHS in 1974, after which he left for Hong Kong. He was succeeded as headmaster by Yap Koon Chan. He went to teach at the St. Francis Xavier's College at Tai Kok Tsui, where he remained until finally retiring in 1988. He then left for Rome, where he spent six years engaged in translation and archival work for the Catholic Church. He performed as organist with the choir there.

Chang returned to Singapore in 1994 to aid CHS in fundraising. In 1996, the school's Old Boys' Association established a teacher-training fund for the school in his name. He aided in the effort to secure pledges for the fund, performing Charles Gounod's Ave Maria in Latin at a dinner of the association in October. On that night, the association raised $360,000 for the fund, which was over ten times the original target. The majority of the funds raised reportedly came from pledges that "poured in" as Chang sang. However, it was decided in 1998 that the funds would be awarded to "top primary school pupils" as scholarships instead. This was to help address the school's academic performance, which had declined in the past half a decade; CHS had slipped from 11th to 19th place in the national schools ranking from 1992 to 1996.

== Personal life and death ==
Chang was "penniless" due to his devotion to the church. He was musically inclined, being certified by the ABRSM and the Trinity College London. He was the choirmaster at CHS and would "share his musical knowledge enthusiastically" with the school band. He could play the violin, piano, organ, harmonica and trumpet. In addition to English, Chinese and French, Chang was also fluent in Italian and Latin.

Shortly after arriving in Singapore for the first time, a tumour was found in Chang's lung and he then underwent a successful surgical operation. After Rome, Chang returned to Singapore and was residing at the convent at 15 Flower Lane by 1996. He continued to engage in translation work on occasion. In June 2021, his health declined suddenly and he was hospitalised for 10 days. He died in his sleep on 4 July. The funeral was held at the Church of The Immaculate Heart of Mary three days after and he was then cremated at the Mandai Crematorium and Columbarium.
