= Sandro Bocola =

Italian writer and artist (1931–2022)

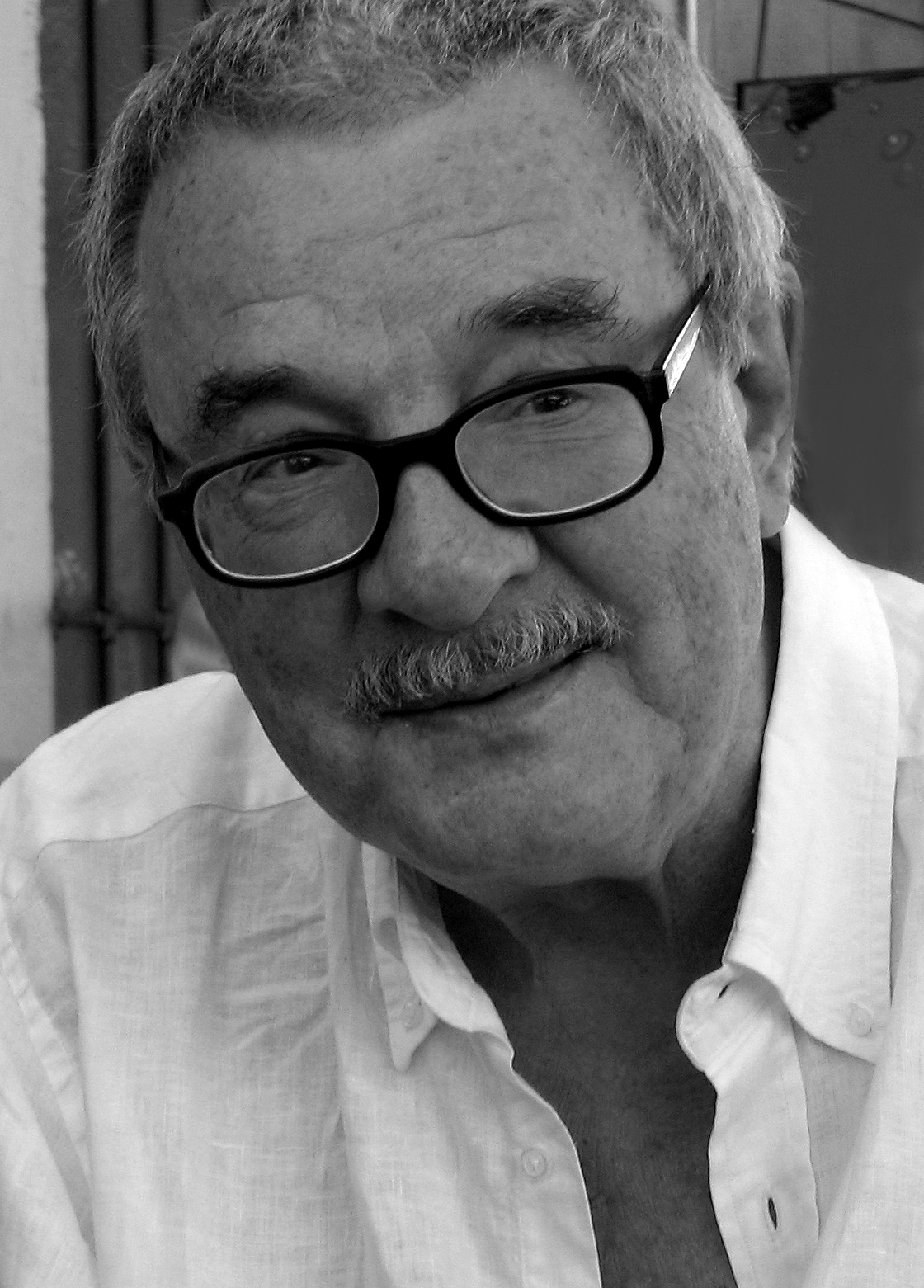
Sandro Bocola

Sandro Bocola (16 March 1931 – 6 October 2022) was an Italian-Swiss writer and artist.

== Life and career ==
Sandro Bocola was born in Trieste, Italy on 16 March 1931. He grew up in Italy, Libya and Switzerland. After studying for one and a half years at the School for Arts and Crafts in Basel, Bocola started a career as an artist. In 1955, he moved to Barcelona, where he temporarily gave up painting to work as a commercial graphic designer. During a ten-year stay in Paris and his moving in 1969, together with his family, to Zürich, Bocola was simultaneously working as graphic designer and artist. After completing a psychoanalysis and further studies at the Psychoanalytical Seminar Zürich, since 1975 he dedicated himself to the mediation of art as publisher of the multiple edition Xartcollection and the wallpaper collection Xartwalls, as curator of various exhibitions and as author of several books on the history of Art and the development of Modernism.. In 2002, Bocola installed himself in a second residence in Barcelona, where he created several videos and large-scale digital art prints. Due to the tepid reception of his last three exhibitions, he decided to give up any further digital art work, in 2007. Bocola died on 6 October 2022, at the age of 91.

== Art ==
Bocola's artistic production can be divided in three epochs:

1950 – 55 (from cubism to non figurative geometric abstraction)

1965 – 72 (fusion of photographic figuration wit geometric graphic elements)

2002 – 05 (Altering this concept by introducing digital processing)

One man shows in Basel, Geneva and Barcelona, group shows in Basel, Zürich, Geneva, Paris, London, Oslo, Eindhoven, Berlin, New York, Philadelphia and Caracas.

In 1968, he founded (together with three partners: Heinz Bütler, Rolf Fehlbaum and Erwin Meierhofer) the Multiple Edition Xartcollection. 1971 Edition of the artists wallpaper collection Xartwalls.

== Graphic Design & Art Direction ==
1959–1980 Freelance designer in Barcelona, Zürich, Basel and Paris.

1959 - 1960 collaborator of Graphis Magazine, Zürich.

1961- 1962 art director of the advertising agency Robert Delpire, Paris. Design of ads and posters for large département stores (PKZ, C&A, Jelmoli, CharlesVögele).

== Exhibition Design ==
In 1959, the Swiss department store Globus hired Bocola to conceive and design the exhibition "Man as reflected in Science" in the shop windows of its Basel branch.

In 1978 foundation and installation of the "Museo de Arte Popular" in Horta de Sant Joan, Spain.

1992–1994 Curator of the exhibition "African Seats" for the Vitra Design Museum in Weil am Rhein. Opening: 10. Juni 1994, Further venues: 1994 Paris/France, 1995 Munich/Germany and Kolding/Denmark, 1995/96 Vienna/Austria, 1996 Tervuren/Belgium.

== Books ==
Starting in 1981 Bocola wrote a series of articles and books on social history and the psychology of art.

1987: Die Erfahrung des Ungewissen in der Kunst der Gegenwart. Waser Verlag, Zürich

1994: Die Kunst der Moderne. Zur Struktur und Dynamik ihrer Entwicklung. Von Goya bis Beuys. Prestel, München/New York

1995: African Seats, which was published in an English, a German and a French edition, by Prestel, München/New York

1999: El Arte de la Modernidad, Ediciones del Serbal, Barcelona.

2009: The Art of Modernism. Prestel, München/New York

2001: Timelines - The Art of Modernism - 1870-2000, which was published in an English, a German, a French and a Dutch edition, by Taschen Verlag, Köln

2009: The Art of Modernism, Persian edition, by Farhang-e-Moaser, Teheran

2010: Familien Schär und Bocola, private edition, published by Bocola-Lambelet, Basel

== Sources ==
- For the most accurate results on references and sources with regards to Sandro Bocola publications use the Google Book Search:

More references:

- Book: "The Art of Modernism"
- Book: "Timelines"
- University of Missouri-Columbia, "African Seats" book by Sandro Bocola
- "Show Girls" exhibition at the "Sala Vinçon" in Barcelona Spain
- The Barnett Newman foundation (Bocola 1994)
