= Bjarne Melgaard =

Norwegian artist based in New York City (born 1967)

Bjarne Melgaard (born 9 September 1967) is a Norwegian artist based in New York City. He has been described as "one of Norway's most important artists" and, following the 2014 publicity about his sculpture Chair, "the most famous Norwegian artist since Edvard Munch."

== Life and work ==
Melgaard was born in Sydney, Australia, to Norwegian parents and was raised in Oslo, Norway. In 2009, he moved permanently to New York. Melgaard studied at the Norwegian National Academy of Fine Arts, Rijksakademie in Amsterdam from 1991 to 1992 and at the Jan van Eyck Academie in Maastricht from 1992 to 1993.

Early in his career Melgaard created controversial installations referencing subversive subcultures such as S&M and heavy metal music. Currently, his practice consists of an emphasis on expressionistic paintings and drawings, often containing text.

His first show in New York was in 2000, where he exhibited sculptures of apes engaged in sex acts.

In January 2014, Melgaard's artwork Chair caused controversy. Chair is a sculpture of a bound black woman on her back with a seat cushion on her thighs, and is a reinterpretation of a similar piece by British pop artist Allen Jones. The controversy began when Russian art socialite Dasha Zhukova was photographed sitting on the cushion for a fashion website, resulting in online accusations of racism under the Twitter hashtag #racistchair. Guardian critic Jonathan Jones suggested that this controversy was a misunderstanding of Melgaard's intentions, and Zhukova said that the photograph of her was "out of context"; the artwork intended to be a "commentary on gender and racial politics". Melgaard himself released a statement responding to the controversy that was labeled by some writers as "bizarre".

Melgaard has collaborated with Norwegian artist Sverre Koren Bjertnaes in several exhibitions. The two alternated to work on the same canvas, giving them an expression neither of the artists would achieve alone.

== Notable exhibitions ==
2025

- Lion Sluts, Solo exhibition at Patricia Low Contemporary, Venice, Italy

2023

- Golden Suicides, Solo exhibition at Keteleer Gallery, Antwerp, Belgium

2021

- Accrochage, Group exhibition at Galleri Krinzinger, Vienna, Austria

2019

- Naturally Naked, Gary Tatintsian Gallery, Moscow

2014

- Housewife (Edition/Art Print), Galleri Krinzinger

2013

- "Bjarne Melgaard", Astrup Fearnley, Oslo
- "Ignorant Transparencies", Gavin Brown's Enterprise, New York

2012

- "A House to Die In", Institute of Contemporary Arts, London

2009

- Artists of the Gallery, Group Exhibition, Galleri Krinzinger, Vienna, Austria

2008

- Bjarne Melgaard, Greene Naftali Gallery, New York

2007

- The Glamour Chase, Galleri Faurschou, Copenhagen

2006

- Helter Helter, Galerie Anne De Villepoix, Paris
- Les Super, Galerie Guido W. Baudach, Berlin
- A Weekend of Painting; A novel by Les Super, Galerie Leo Koenig, New York

2005

- Jasmine La Nuit, The Horse Hospital, London
- Hallo Maybe, Haugar Vestfold Museum, Oslo

2004

- Tirol Transfer, Oesterreichisches Kulturforum, Warsaw

2003

- Skam, Bergen Kunsthall, Bergen
- The End of The Professional Teenager, Sketch, London

2002

- Black Low, MARTa Herford Museum, Hannover
- Galleria d’Arte Moderna, Bologna

2001

- New Heimat, Kunstverein Frankfurt

2000

- Sharing Exoticisms, 5th Biennale de Lyon

Melgaard appears in Until the Light Takes Us, a documentary about the Norwegian black metal scene in the 1990s. The film featured in the 15th Athens International Film Festival (16–27 September 2009), screened at Danaos Cinema. In the film, an exhibition of Melgaard's in a Stockholm gallery is extensively shown, along with his comments on black/death metal.
