= Chua Ek Kay =

Singaporean artist (1947–2008)

Chua Ek Kay 蔡逸溪
- Born: 21 November 1947; Chenghai County, Guangdong Province, Republic of China
- Died: 8 February 2008 (aged 60); Singapore
- Education: Taught privately by Fan Chang Tien; Lasalle-SIA College of the Arts (1990); BFA (University of Tasmania); MA (Hons) (University of Western Sydney)
- Known for: Chinese ink painting
- Spouse: Mdm. Yeo Yang Kwee
- Awards: 1991: UOB 10th Painting of the Year Award (Grand Prize) 1998: Philip Morris Group of Companies ASEAN Art Awards, Juror's Choice; 1999: Cultural Medallion for Art 2002: Lasalle-SIA College of the Arts Fellowship

Chua Ek Kay (Chinese: 蔡逸溪; pinyin: Cài Yìxī; 21 November 1947 – 8 February 2008) was a Singaporean artist. He painted, among other things, abstract works inspired by Australian aboriginal cave paintings.

== Early years ==
Chua Ek Kay was born in Chenghai County, Guangdong Province, China, on 1947, the eldest of seven children. In the 1950s, his family migrated to Singapore, and settled in Liang Seah Street. Chinese cultural influences were very much a part of his daily life and art, and as a child Chua picked up Chinese literature and poetry, and practised writing Chinese characters with his father. Even in school, he often took part in calligraphy and classical poetry activities as a student at the Catholic High School. He excelled in both areas, writing his own poems and becoming known in school for his excellent poetic calligraphy. This reputation soon spread to local calligraphy and poetic circles.

In 1975, the 28-year-old Chua became a student of Chinese brush painting and seal-carving of Singaporean master ink painter, Fan Chang Tien.

== Artistic career ==
Though he was deeply passionate about art, Chua continued to make his living by taking on a variety of jobs. Finally, in 1985, he resigned his post as a manager of a garment factory to become a full-time artist. At the age of 38 he embarked on his artistic journey, supplementing his income as a lecturer with the Extramural Studies Department of the National University of Singapore.

Bicycles Rest at the Backlane (2000) 60 x 76 cm. Ink on paper. Collection of the NUS Museums.

He began exploring his ideas about art, breaking away from traditionalist Shanghai School-styled subjects. Remembering his childhood days in Liang Seah Street and its community, Chua found new inspirations in his paintings from mountains and lakes, to shophouses and even abstract works inspired by Australian aboriginal cave paintings.

As he explored new expressions in art, he found similarities between the Shanghai School style and the works of Western artists like Henri Matisse, Pablo Picasso and Jackson Pollock in terms of artistic spontaneity. This new-found interest in Western art led him to study the subject at the Lasalle-SIA College of the Arts (now the LASALLE College of the Arts) in 1990. He was also to spend several more years engaged in a comparative study of eastern and western concepts in painting in Australia, receiving a Bachelor of Fine Arts (BFA) from the University of Tasmania and a Master of Arts (MA (Hons)) from the University of Western Sydney. Nevertheless, the Chinese brush style which he had picked up earlier never left him, and its influence continued to flow in his paintings.

On 21 August 2006, Chua launched his "Street Scenes Collection" series of paintings at the Singapore Management University (SMU). Valued at S$302,000, these 30 works depict scenes of old shop houses, narrow alleyways, historic sites and other memories portraying Singapore's heritage, in his signature brush styles – a legacy of 20 years of artistic practice. He officially donated this Collection to the University on 18 October 2006, in support of the University's "Visual Arts Initiative" launched earlier in the year. SMU subsequently published a book entitled Chua Ek Kay: Singapore Street Scenes, Evoking Memories (2007).

Lee Boon Yang, the Minister for Information, Communications and the Arts, said of the artist: "Ek Kay has developed a unique style of his own. When one looks at his paintings, one is reminded how a simple approach to life can translate into something powerful. I find his paintings particularly interesting in the way he injects so much passion and emotion into a minimalist landscape."

== Aesthetics and philosophy in his art ==
When Chua was under the tutelage of Fan Chang Tien, he not only learnt the four elements of the "Shanghai School" – calligraphy, classical poetry, painting and seal-carving from his master. Fan drilled him in the principles of 花鸟 (Chinese: huā niǎo, or "flower–bird"), and enforced Chua's foundations in his art. This also intensified his interest in art, studying the aesthetics of post-Ming Dynasty masters particularly of Shih-Tao.

Fan Chang Tien also reminded Chua to be expressive in whatever subject matter he painted, for there was rhythm with each stroke. This "life" in his paintings also had to come with an understanding of "black within black", expressing art through different gradations of ink tones to capture a "simplistic complexity" in the depiction of the subject matter.

As he explored Western ideas in his art, he found that the difference between western and eastern art lay solely in their spirits: western art was forceful, and eastern art more introspective. He also found that the emergence of "east-west art fusion" in art adopted by pioneer Singapore artists in the 1950s and 1960s was partly due to the Cultural Revolution. That Revolution not only closed China's door from the rest of the world, it also locked away its "conventional Chinese art themes of snowy peaks and gushing rivers" that were identified with by Chinese artists overseas. Singapore artists then realized they did not really relate to these conventional art themes and they should adopt familiar subjects that they could distill through their emotion and artistry. Many artists in that period were also English-educated, and thus adopted western ideas as alternative sources of art. While Chua's creations are infused with Western artistic spontaneity, he felt that tradition continued to play an important role in breaking new ground and generating inspirations in art.

Chua continued to practise Han calligraphy and ink-brush painting, as he believed that while a contemporary painting had to keep up with the times and embody an artist's temperament and the ideals he stands for, in creating art he should be rooted to certain basic rules and formats. The discipline of Chinese art helped to strengthen his lines, while western techniques helped him in the mixing of tones. These techniques formed the basis of his art.

== Death and tributes ==
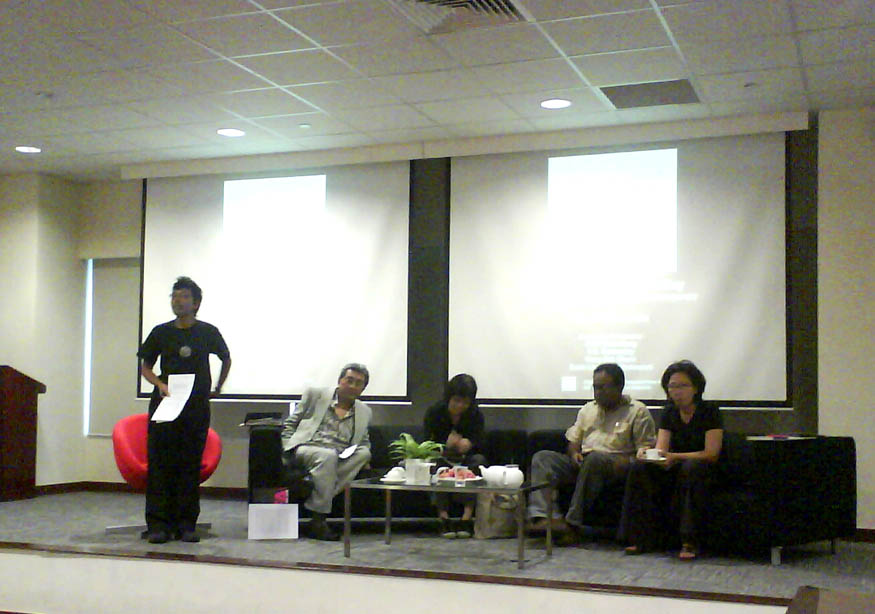
Roundtable participants (from left to right) Susie Lingham (moderator, standing), Cheo Chai-Hiang, Hong Sek Chern, T.K. Sabapathy, and Joanna Lee.

On 8 February 2008, Chua died at the age of 61 after having battled nasal cancer since 2004.

"With Chua's passing," said Edmund Cheng, the Chairman of the National Arts Council, "Singapore has lost a great artist and a towering talent... To his friends and fellow artists, Ek Kay was a man of few words, and was always respected for his quiet confidence and humility despite his outstanding international success. Ek Kay was an exemplary artist who had left us at his peak."

On 18 March 2008, The Nanyang Academy of Fine Arts paid tribute to Chua with a roundtable session titled Remembering Chua Ek Kay: Ink Painting and the Idea of the Contemporary. Using Chua's works as the basis for discussion, the forum sought to engage the audience in a discussion on the meaning of contemporary art in Singapore. Guest speaker Joanna Lee, author of Chua Ek Kay: Singapore Street Scenes, Evoking Memories (2007), together with artists Cheo Chai-Hiang and Hong Sek Chern, touched on Chua's creations and the development of his ideas over the years.

This was followed by a memorial service for Chua, on 17 May 2008, organised jointly by the Singapore Art Museum and Singapore Management University (SMU). The service marked the 100th day of the artist's death, with tributes delivered by Museum director Kwok Kian Chow, arts patron Koh Seow Chuan, the late artist's widow Mdm Yeo Yang Kwee and many other people whom Chua had worked with in his lifetime. Mdm Yeo also unveiled two untitled paintings at the service, and announced her donation of Chua's "representative collection" to the Singapore Art Museum.

== Major exhibitions ==
Dates	Title	Location
1988	A Selection of Chinese Brush Paintings and Calligraphy	Extramural Studies Department, National University of Singapore; Singapore
9–13 September 1992	Duality and Tension	National Museum Art Gallery; Singapore
1995	Recent Works by Chua Ek Kay (solo)	University of Western Sydney; Sydney, Australia
20–23 September; 24 September – 6 October 1997	Colour of Infinity (solo)	Caldwell House, CHIJMES, and Art Forum; Singapore
1998	Hunter of the Wilderness (solo)	Art Forum; Singapore
1998	Philip Morris–ASEAN Art Exhibition	Hanoi, Vietnam
1999	CRISP	Singapore Art Museum; Singapore
1999	Power and Poetry, Monuments and Meditations in Chinese Ink Painting	Singapore Art Museum; Singapore
1999	Beyond Tradition: Art of the New Migrant Chinese; Ambulation	Earl Lu Gallery; Singapore
1–31 December 2000	Lyrical Spaces (solo)	Wetterling Teo Gallery; Singapore
2001	Street Scenes Revisited (solo)	Soobin Gallery; Singapore
2001	Asean Art Today 2001	Earl Lu Gallery; Singapore
2001	Ink & Colour, 3 Singaporean Artists	Kuala Lumpur, Malaysia
2001	Nokia Singapore Art 2001	Singapore Art Museum; Singapore
2002	Timeless Space Damask Asia	London, England, UK
2003	Chua Ek Kay: Being & Becoming: The Lotus Pond Series	Singapore Tyler Print Institute; Singapore
23 August – 4 September 2005	逸溪 (YiXi) (solo)	Shanghai Art Museum; China
19–22 December 2007	Along the River Banks (solo)	Singapore Tyler Print Institute; Singapore
26 November 2015 – 30 October 2016	Chua Ek Kay: After the Rain 2016	National Gallery Singapore; Singapore
20 October - 20 December 2018	A Long Way from Home	Singapore Management University Singapore

Some information in the above table was obtained from Chua Ek Kay (Singaporean, 1947): Selected exhibitions, ArtNet: The Art World Online.
