= Derek Boshier =

English artist (1937–2024)

Derek Boshier (19 June 1937 – 5 September 2024) was an English artist, among the first proponents of British pop art. He worked in various media including painting, drawing, collage, and sculpture. In the 1970s he shifted from painting to photography, film, video, assemblage, and installations, but he returned to painting by the end of the decade. Addressing the question of what shapes his work, Boshier once stated "Most important is life itself, my sources tend to be current events, personal events, social and political situations, and a sense of place and places". His work uses popular culture and the mixing of high and low culture to confront government, revolution, sex, technology and war with subversive dark humor.

Boshier was commissioned by David Bowie, The Clash, and Pretty Things.

== Early life and education ==
Derek Boshier was born in Portsmouth, England in 1937. He attended Yeovil School of Art (now Yeovil College) in Somerset from 1953-1957 (BA). He attended the Royal College of Art in London, 1959–1962 alongside David Hockney, Pauline Boty, Allen Jones and Peter Phillips, receiving his MA (RCA) in 1962.

The boredom of the previous few years of National Service in the Royal Engineers had been alleviated by reading the works of Marshall McLuhan. During his college years, his work was didactic, commenting on the space race, the all-powerful multinationals and the increasing Americanisation of English culture.

After graduating, he spent a year traveling in India on an Indian government scholarship. Boshier served as an instructor at the Central School of Art and Design, London from 1963 to 1979 and concurrently at the Royal College of Art London from 1973 to 1979. Boshier moved to Houston, Texas in the United States in 1980, after accepting a one-year visiting artist position at the University of Houston, and then joined the faculty there from 1981 to 1992. He moved back to England 1992 to 1997 and later joined the faculty of the California Institute of Arts in Los Angeles in 1997, where he lived until his death in 2024. Though associated with the art and culture of both London and Los Angeles, Boshier also lived in Houston, Somerset and Wales at different junctures.

== Career ==
=== Royal College ===
==== Pop Goes the Easel ====
While still at the Royal College of Art Derek Boshier appeared with Peter Blake, Pauline Boty and Peter Phillips in Pop Goes the Easel (1962), a film by Ken Russell for the BBC's Monitor series. A pioneering program, Monitor's editors encouraged Russell to be ambitious and the resulting film can also be seen as a collaboration, taking inspiration from the formal aesthetics and themes within work of its artist-subjects. Like the work of Boshier, the film was a spliced and shuffled collage that startled its viewers. Pop Goes the Easel established the similarities that united this group of pop artists while also establishing their differences. Boshier emerged as relatively articulate and concerned with social issues and critical writings on the impact of advertising on social identity and democratic politics. Though he used the visual elements of pop art such as flags maps and comics, we can see in his early work a marked political concern, especially with current events and expansion of American power. Boshier believed that, "The world's at peril," and that it was impossible to avoid being political.

The film forever placed Boshier at Pop Art's origins and anointed him one of its British kings. As is a theme within Boshier's life and work, he and Russell became friends and Boshier later played the role of John Everett Millais in Russell's television film Dante's Inferno (1967); his girlfriend Gala Mitchell played Jane Morris.

==== Royal College notable works ====
Notable works that came out of Boshier's time at the Royal College show his differentiating concern with political action and discourse.

- Special K
- I Wonder What my Heroes Think of the Space Race
- Man Playing Snooker and Thinking of Other Things
- The Identi-Kit Man

=== 1970s ===
Feeling that painting was too not able to properly carry the assault of images in everyday life, Boshier stopped painting for 13 years, instead using photographs, films and book art that was often political. It is at this time that Bosher's interest in technologies of representation became obvious. Through this topic he explored his other interests of the close connection between life and art, accessibility of art and the related breakdown between high and low art. His groundbreaking exhibition "Lives: An exhibition of artists whose work is based on other people's lives" subsequently took place at The Hayward Gallery in 1979. While using many mediums, Boshier always continued to draw and it is through this drawings that the viewer is most connected to the consistent way Boshier employed the concepts of style, graphic, and representation to use art to leave his own signature, as it were, on the popular elements we borrow.

=== Career ===
Never one to allow his message to be governed by any particular medium, at the 1964 The New Generation show at the Whitechapel Gallery he exhibited large shaped canvases with vibrant areas of evenly applied colour. Boshier's work was included in the exhibition "Around the Automobile" in 1965 at The Museum of Modern Art (MoMA), New York. After 1966 he has used metal, coloured plastics, even neon light, the materials of the commercial sign maker, to create three-dimensional objects. Also he has experimented both with books and film.

After making a name for himself as one of Pop Art's elite, starting in the 1970s Boshier created work that broke out of the genre including progressively more graphic figurative paintings and hard-edged, non representational canvases on the border of Op Art. His work in photography, screen-print, film, collage, and assemblage has led critic Jonathan Griffin to argue that Derek Boshier, although foremost a painter, is more vastly a contemporary artist rather than just a pop artist.

During the early 1970s Boshier taught at Central School of Art and Design where one of his pupils was John Mellor (later known as Joe Strummer of The Clash). This led to Boshier designing The Clash's second song book which included a collection of drawings and paintings released in conjunction with the album Give 'Em Enough Rope.

In 1979 at the request of David Bowie, portrait photographer Brian Duffy introduced the two artists. This meeting resulted in a 37-year friendship that lasted until Bowie's death. Boshier designed David Bowie cover art for Lodger and Let's Dance. For Lodger, Boshier also designed the inner gatefold which featured a college of images representing the themes of life and death. Boshier also designed stage sets for Bowie.

Derek Boshier moved to Houston, Texas in the 1980s, at a time when contemporary art in Texas and Houston in particular, were receiving national and international attention. The Houston skyline and other impressions of the region, from cowboys to corporate business executives (suggestive of the oil industry or Texas Instruments Inc.), appeared in a number of his canvases from this period. Several notable museum exhibitions included or surveyed his work form this period including: "Derek Boshier: Paintings from 1980–1981", Contemporary Arts Museum Houston 1981; "Derek Boshier: Texas Works", Institute of Contemporary Arts, London 1982; "Fresh Paint, The Houston School" Museum of Fine Arts, Houston 1985 (traveling to P.S.1 Contemporary Art Center (now MoMA PS1), Long Island City, New York); "Derek Boshier: The Texas Years", Contemporary Art Museum, Houston 1995.

Boshier lived in Los Angeles, U.S.. Social commentary had once more become a major element of his work tackling head on subjects that have strong political overtones such as gun control, police brutality and once again, the multinationals – this time on home turf. He was a visiting lecturer at University of California Los Angeles School of Arts where he taught drawing.

=== Themes ===
==== American culture and influence ====
Starting at the Royal College Boshier explored his fascination with the soft-power and hybrid marketing and cross-referencing of products, notably Special K cereal, as a means of diffusing and neutralizing American influence. Perpetually interested in "the now", Boshier also explored the space race in 1962. The resulting paintings, The Most Handsome Hero of the Cosmos and Mr. Shepherd and I Wonder What My Heroes Think of the Space Race, explore what he saw as traditional heroes, defined by epic adventure, being supplanted by celebrities who were famous for being famous. Boshier saw the astronaut as a counter balance to this trend and through these works painted them in historical and heroic contexts.

Unlike other pop artists of his era, especially those captured in Russell's Pop Goes the Easel, Boshier was outspokenly critical of the expansion of American influence and the impact of advertising on identity, seen in The Identi-Kit Man and Man Playing Snooker and Thinking of Other Things. Through these works we also see Boshier's reflections on the fragility and fragmentation of heterosexual masculinity in the face of technology and consumption.

=== Beliefs about art ===
Highly influenced by Samuel Beckett, Boshier said that it is the not knowing, the unknowability, that ultimately makes art compelling for him. For Boshier, Pop Art denoted not just what was popular, but also the potential for a popularism that is unlike political popularism, with its de facto opposition to the elite. Instead, Boshier's work celebrates commonly held experiences without making distinctions between high and low or historical and contemporary.

== Friendships ==
Within the art world Boshier was famous for the way he built and maintained friendships. David Hockney, a close friend of Boshier's since 1957 when they met during their interview for the Royal College of Art, described, "He sends me things by ordinary mail that always have decorated envelopes...Sometimes it's a cutting from a newspaper (very old fashioned) or a drawing. I assume he does this for a lot of other people." Hockney also said of Boshier that he has always kept his sense of wonder.

== Death ==
Boshier died on 5 September 2024, at the age of 87.

== Public collections ==
- Muzeum Sztuki Łódź, Poland
- Tate Gallery – his 1962 painting The Identi-Kit Man was purchased in 1971.
- The Museum of Fine Arts, Houston
- Museum of Modern Art, New York
- Wolverhampton Art Gallery, UK – The Stun (1979) & Untitled (1964)

== Exhibition history ==
- Derek Boshier: Image in Revolt. Wolverhampton Art Gallery, UK. (7 October 2023 – 21 January 2024). Curated by Helen Little in collaboration with Wolverhampton Art Gallery.

== Bibliography ==
Exhibition catalogues

- Anonymous (1982). Derek Boshier: Texas Works. Institute of Contemporary Arts. London, 32 pp.
- Barbara Rose and Susie Kalil (1985). Fresh Paint, The Houston School. Texas Monthly Press, Austin, Texas. 256 pp.
- Mayo, Marti, Guy Brett, and Lynn Herbert (1995). Derek Boshier: The Texas Years. Contemporary Art Museum, Houston/Distributed Art Publishers. 64 pp.
- Weitman, Wendy (1999). Pop Impressions Europe/USA: Prints and Multiples from A The Museum of Modern Art, New York. 136 pp.
- Derek Boshier Works on paper, a retrospective 1955-2003 [Catalogue of the exhibition held at Mary Elizabeth Dee Shaw Gallery 2003] Utah.
- Derek Boshier: New Paintings, Chemical Culture Series [Catalogue of the exhibition held at Flowers East 2008] London.
- Extreme Makeover [Catalogue of the exhibition held at Flowers Gallery May 9 - June 14, 2008] New York.

Journals, Magazines, and Newspapers

- Bloom, Suzanne and Ed Hill (1985), Derek Boshier, Texas Gallery. Artforum, September, 24(1): 131
- Cotter, Holland (1986). Derek Boshier at TotahStelling. Art in America, October, 74(10): 57–59.
- Reinhold, Robert (1983). Cities in Texas Witness Flowering of Fine Arts. New York Times, May 14.

Publications

- Little, Helen (ed). (2023) Derek Boshier: Reinventor. Lund Humphries. ISBN 978-1-84822-660-9

== See also ==
- What Do Artists Do All Day?
