= Mark Hudson (author) =

British writer, journalist and art critic

Mark Hudson (born 29 March 1957) is a British writer, journalist and art critic. Since 2021 he has been chief art critic of The Independent. He has won multiple awards.

== Biography ==
Hudson was born on 29 March 1957 in Harrogate, England. He completed his B.A. with honors from Winchester School of Art.

Hudson's books are diverse in subject matter, but united by their approach which incorporates elements of history, travel writing, cultural criticism and personal participation. As a journalist Hudson has written extensively about African music and culture, and two of his books are set in Africa. Our Grandmothers' Drums, based on a year spent living in a village in the Gambia, described the author's personal and emotional involvement in village life with a frankness considered unusual in either travel writing or anthropology. ‘I have rarely read a book of greater passion or honesty,’ wrote the Sunday Times. While the book's candidness attracted some criticism, particularly in the U.S., it won two literary awards, Thomas Cook Travel Book Award (1990) and Somerset Maugham Award (1990). The Music in my Head, a scabrous satire on the world music phenomenon, set in a fictional West African city, offended many in the world music milieu, while receiving different reactions from others.

Coming Back Brockens, based on a year spent in a former mining village in the north of England – where the author's grandfather and great-grandfather were both miners – was acclaimed in The Independent as "a pained description of an England that has all but exhausted itself". Hudson's most recent book, Titian, the Last Days, is a personal study of the great Venetian painter Titian, focusing on his mysterious last paintings.

Hudson is a regular contributor to the Daily Telegraph and has also written for The Observer, the Mail on Sunday, the Financial Times, the Sunday Times and the Guardian.

== Art Criticism ==
Hudson was chief art critic of the Daily Telegraph from 2015 to 2019. He has been a notable and often acerbic commentator on British contemporary art, particularly of the post-YBA generation – artists coming after the so-called Young British Artists – accusing the 2015 Turner Prize exhibition of “cosseted vapidity.”

“This is art that exists only to fill exhibitions such as this one, that wouldn't exist without subsidies, commissions and the whole lucrative contemporary art system. There's no sense of energy or struggle in this work, either with the surrounding cultural environment or within the art itself.”

British Art Show 8, was for him “the product of an art scene in which the curator, rather than the artist, is the dominant figure,” resulting in art with “a numbing narrowness of tone and concern...like bright student work that hasn't had to stick its head over the art world parapet to face the realities the rest of us are living through."”

For Hudson, the artist of today is “an oddly colourless creature who seems intent on writing him or herself out of the picture – in every sense,” a figure typified by the 2018 Turner Prize-winner Charlotte Prodger, whose films are “at once unapologetically difficult – with their long takes and rambling narration – and strangely self-effacing. Like something one might post on Facebook, they seem to espouse, perhaps not entirely deliberately, the social media ethos that everyone's experiences are equally valid.”

Hudson was, however, positive about the official exhibition at the 2019 Venice Biennale, May You Live In Interesting Times, dominated by artists from Asia and Latin America. “You're left wondering if the notion of “taste”, in the good and bad sense, now has any meaning... But there is a sense of energy, the feeling that art in our globalised, digitally emancipated times has gained a momentum that will power it forward whatever the fates of individuals or nations.”

== Awards ==
- NCR Book Award (now the Samuel Johnson Prize) for Coming Back Brockens.
- Thomas Cook Travel Book Award for Our Grandmothers' Drums.
- Somerset Maugham Award for Our Grandmothers' Drums.

== Works ==
Books

- Our Grandmothers’ Drums (1989)
- Coming Back Brockens (1994)
- The Music in my Head (1998)
- Titian, the Last Days (2009)

Discography

- The Music in my Head (Sterns)
- The Music in my Head Vol 2 (Sterns 2002)
- Etoile de Dakar "Once Upon A Time In Senegal" (Sterns) (Notes)
