= Peter Phillips (artist) =

British artist (1939–2025)

- Born: 21 May 1939; Birmingham, England
- Died: 23 June 2025 (aged 86); Sunshine Coast, Queensland, Australia
- Education: Birmingham School of Art, Royal College of Art
- Occupation: Artist
- Known for: Painting, collage, sculpture, screenprint, lithography
- Movement: Pop Art

Peter Phillips (21 May 1939 – 23 June 2025) was an English artist whose work ranged from conventional oils on canvas to multi-media compositions and collages to sculptures and architecture.

As an originator of Pop art, Phillips trained at the Royal College of Art with his contemporaries David Hockney, Allen Jones, R.B. Kitaj and others figures in British Pop Art. When he was awarded a Harkness Fellowship he moved to New York, where he exhibited alongside American counterparts Andy Warhol, Roy Lichtenstein and James Rosenquist. Phillips later returned to Europe, where he resided and continued to paint and exhibit.

== Biography ==
For Men Only – Starring MM and BB (1961), Oil, wood and collage on canvas.

Phillips was born in 1939 in Bournville, Birmingham, England. From 1953 to 1955, he studied at Moseley Road Secondary School of Art in Birmingham and from 1955 to 1959 at the Birmingham School of Art. In 1959, he visited Paris and started to exhibit at the RBA Galleries in London.

=== 1960s ===
Between 1959 and 1962, Phillips studied at the Royal College of Art where he saw reproductions of work by Jasper Johns and Robert Rauschenberg. He was particularly aligned to American culture and reflected its commercial iconography and aggressive advertising style in his dynamic montage paintings. In 1962, he was one of the subjects of the programme "Pop Goes the Easel," produced for the series Monitor and directed by Ken Russell, along with Peter Blake, Pauline Boty and Derek Boshier.

From 1962 to 1963, he taught at the Coventry College of Art and the Birmingham College of Art. In 1963, he was represented at the Paris Biennale, and in 1964 his work was included in the Pop Art exhibition shown at the Hague, Vienna and Berlin.

In 1964, Phillips was awarded the Harkness Fellowship, which brought him to New York where he lived from 1964 until 1966 and while there travelled throughout the United States with his close friend, Allen Jones.

In 1965, he had his first one-man exhibition at the Kornblee Gallery, New York. A year later, Phillips returned to Europe, and from 1968 to 1969, he was guest teacher at the Hochschule für bildende Künste Hamburg.

=== 1970s ===
In 1970, Peter Phillips married Claude Marion Xylander, and they made frequent trips throughout Africa, the Far East, and the United States. Throughout the decade of the seventies, the Phillips resided in Zurich, Switzerland.

In 1972, Phillips had a retrospective at the Westfälischer Kunstverein, Münster, and in 1976 at the Tate Gallery, London. In 1977, he had a retrospective in Milan.

=== 1980s ===
In 1981, Phillips' travels took him to Australia. In 1982-83, he had a retrospective exhibition shown at the Walker Art Gallery in Liverpool; the Museum of Modern Art, Oxford; the Laing Art Gallery in Newcastle-upon-Tyne; the Fruitmarket Gallery in Edinburgh; Southampton Art Gallery and the Barbican Art Gallery in London.

In 1987, Phillips moved from Zurich to Mallorca. Throughout the eighties his work was exhibited at galleries around Spain, including Barcelona, Valencia, Madrid, and Mallorca.

=== 1990s ===
The decade of the 1990s brought Phillips' work to Canada and the United States, for exhibitions in Montreal, Boston, Houston, and New York. He was a featured artist at the Fundacio Miro and Casal Solleric in Mallorca in 1996. In 1998, he was exhibited in London at the "Freedom of Choices" exhibition. At the same time, Phillips built and expanded his property in Mallorca to his own design, which has been featured in numerous architecture, gardening, and home magazines.

In 1995, he designed the Granada Television idents and endboards featuring the "G-arrow".

=== 2000–2025 ===
A Phillips retrospective was shown in 2002 at the Galleria Civica di Modena, Italy.

Phillips' War/Game is featured on the cover of American rock band the Strokes' second album Room on Fire.

Claude-Marion Phillips died from cancer on 30 January 2003. In 2004, Phillips staged an exhibition dedicated to his wife, Claude, at Whitford Fine Art (London) and was featured at the "Pop Art UK" group exhibition at Galleriea Civica di Modena, Italy.

In 2005, the "Metamorphosis" exhibition was shown at the Goulanderis Foundation (Andros, Greece) and the "British Pop" group exhibition at the Museo de Bellas Artes (Bilbao, Spain).

Phillips resided in Europe, where he continued to paint and exhibit. He traveled frequently to New York, Los Angeles, San Francisco, and Sydney.

Over thirty of his prints are in the Tate Collection.

Phillips lived in Australia in the final decade of his life. He died on the Sunshine Coast, Queensland, on 23 June 2025, at the age of 86.

An open-air exhibition of Phillips' work opened in his native Birmingham in June 2026; the curator Ruth Millington described it as "the perfect way to remember him" and celebrate the influence of his home city on his work.
