= Wetterling Teo Gallery =

Coordinates: 1.2952°N 103.8366°E

The Wetterling Teo Gallery is one of the first international contemporary art galleries to operate in South-East Asia. Established in 1994, the gallery is the result of a joint venture between Wetterling Gallery in Sweden, and Daniel Teo in Singapore.

It represents top American artists — such as Jasper Johns, Roy Lichtenstein, James Rosenquist, Robert Rauschenberg and Frank Stella — and pioneers of the POP generation such as the British artists David Hockney, Allen Jones and Richard Hamilton.

The gallery has worked with these established artists for more than ten years and, as a result, has formed close friendships with them, enabling it to bring their newest and best work to this region as well as to its partner gallery Wetterling in Sweden.
