= Pedagogical Sketchbook =

Book by Paul Klee

- Author: Paul Klee
- Genre: Pedagogy
- Publication date: 1953

Pedagogical Sketchbook is a book by Paul Klee. It is based on his extensive lectures on visual form at Bauhaus Staatliche Art School where he was a teacher between 1921-1931. Originally handwritten – as a pile of working notes he used in his lectures – it was eventually edited by Walter Gropius, designed by László Moholy-Nagy and published as a Bauhaus student manual (Bauhausbucher No.2, as the second in the series of the fourteen Bauhaus books) under the original title: Pädagogisches Skizzenbuch. It was translated into English by Sibyl Moholy-Nagy (in 1953), who also wrote an introduction for it.

Along with other Bauhaus books such as Theory of Color (by Johannes Itten) and Point and Line to Plane (by Wassily Kandinsky), Pedagogical Sketchbook is a legacy of teaching methods on art theory and practice at Bauhaus Staatliche Art School.

The book is still in print.

== Background ==
During his teaching career at Bauhaus, Klee reflected on his own working methods and techniques. “When I came to be teacher”, he wrote, “I had to account explicitly for what I had been used to doing unconsciously.” He left over 3000 handwritten pages developed as a theoretical basis for his lectures, some of which are still unpublished.

From the same period comes another one of his books: The thinking Eye, dealing with the same issues as Pedagogical Sketchbook, but much more extensive in scope. However, this book was published and translated later, after his death (1956; trans. 1961).

== Teaching concept ==
Pedagogical Sketchbook is an intuitive art investigation of dynamic principles in visual arts. Klee takes his students on an ‘adventure in seeing’ guiding them step-by-step through a challenging conceptual framework. Objects are rendered in a complex relation to physical and intellectual space concepts. It is an exercise in modern art thinking.

In her introduction, Sibyl Moholy-Nagy divides the book into 4 different parts corresponding to the 4 conceptual frameworks. Each framework is illustrated by intricate drawings (mixture of what looks like creative arithmetic or geometry sketches, scribbles and mental notes).

Starting chapter concerns ‘Line and Structure’. A dot goes for a walk… freely and without a goal. Dot is a “point of progression” and by shifting its position forward becomes a line. Line variations lead to even more complex structures. It can move freely in a calligraphic stroke, or circumscribe, act as a planar definition, as a mathematical structural element (as in Golden Section) or as a path in motion (when it coordinates kinetic movements such as in muscle contraction). Artist's world is dynamic – in the state of becoming – rather than static.

In ‘Dimension and Balance’, the line is related to psychological and social concepts of space. Klee explains subjectivity of our perception by comparing examples of optical illusion with horizon and perspective. We use them as orientation points within the space. As an illustration, Klee uses a stylized drawing representing a tightrope walker with a bamboo stick as a ‘horizon’ point, keeping his balance. These examples evoke our reality as constructed and arbitrary. “Dimension is in itself nothing but an arbitrary expansion of form into height, width, depth and time”. By challenging conventional perception of his students, Klee shows them a way ‘beyond’ physical realm, into the world of metaphysical and spiritual. It is an invitation to approach art intuitively, since outer perception can be deceptive (socially constructed).

The third part is about “Gravitational Curve”. A very first drawing of a strong black arrow pointing downwards postulates man as a tragic figure always brought down by a plummet (a black arrow) of a gravitational force. However, Klee also points that water and atmosphere are transitional regions, where spirit gets lighter and breaks free. This is a spiritual space open to dynamic positions, new symbols and imaginative co-relations of visual elements (mechanical law of nature versus imaginative vision rendering of an object in art).

Continuing further into the final part of the manual ‘Kinetic and Chromatic Energy’, Klee gives examples of ‘creative kinetics’ defying gravitational force such as centripetal force in pendulum and spinning top, or a ‘feathered arrow’. He continues with a ‘symbolic’ arrow illustrating similar efforts of a man to move ‘a bit further than customary – further than possible’.

Last drawings in the book are related to chromatic and thermo-dynamic field where a color is put in relation to motion: “Motion that may be called infinitive…exists only in the activation of color moving between the fervid contrasts of utter black and utter white”.

== See also ==
- Paul Klee
- Sibyl Moholy-Nagy
- Bauhaus
- Abstract Expressionism
