= Nyotaimori =

Serving sushi or sashimi on naked bodies

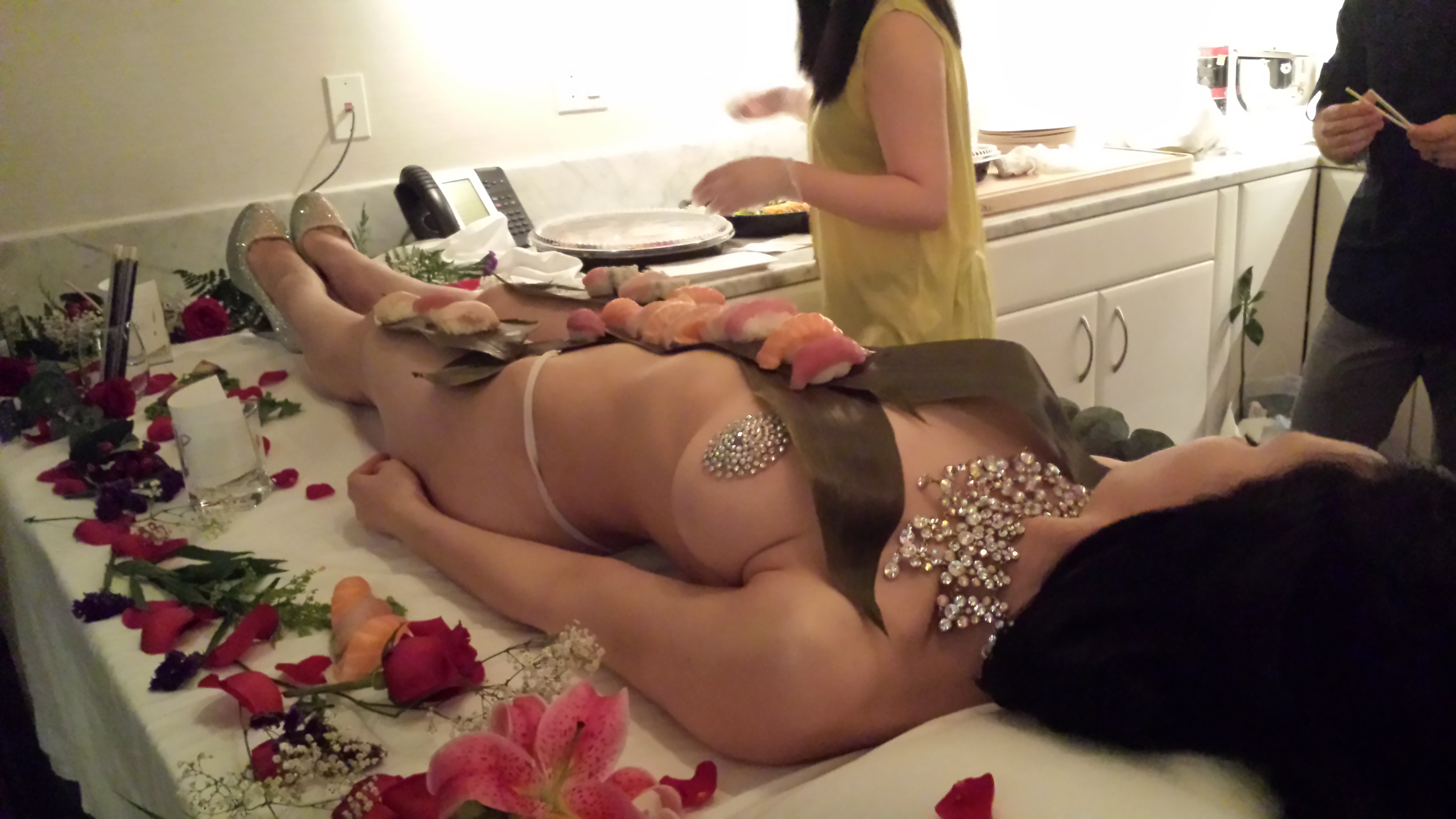
In nyotaimori, a nude woman's body serves as a food plate.

Nyotaimori (女体盛り, 'serve (foods) on the female body'), often referred to as "body sushi", is the Japanese practice of serving sashimi or sushi from the naked body of a woman. The less common male variant is called nantaimori (男体盛り).

== History ==
The origin of nyotaimori can be traced back to the food play of wakamezake (わかめ酒) performed in yūkaku during the Edo period, where sake would be poured into a prostitute's pubic region for drinking. Fuelled by Japan's economic growth in the 1960s, this practice was further evolved by the hot spring bathing (onsen) industry in the Ishikawa Prefecture where the erotic nature of nyotaimori was used as an advertising tactic by the hot spring resorts to attract male customers who were on company trips to the region. The nyotaimori practice dwindled as family and private trips to the onsen destinations became increasingly popular in the 1980s and it was subsequently adopted by catering and sex establishments as an exotic attraction.

Due to the lack of primary sources, the misconceptions of nyotaimori's origin persisted when the practice became internationally known through popular culture.

== Procedures ==
In traditional nyotaimori, the model is generally expected to lie still at all times and usually not talk with guests until the event is concluded even after all food is removed. The sushi is placed on sanitized leaves on the model's body to prevent skin-to-fish contact and on sufficiently flat areas of the body which the sushi will not roll off. In the Japanese style the model's body is fully naked except for traditional footwear and head dress. The Western style sometimes adds a genital covering such as a G-string and plastic wrap is sometimes used to prevent the sushi from touching the model's skin. Diners are required to use chopsticks. Nyotaimori is sometimes considered an art form.

Champagne and sake are usually served in naked sushi restaurants. Guests must be respectful and observe the strictest decorum. Talking with the models is highly discouraged. Inappropriate gestures or comments are not tolerated.

== Reception in the 21st century ==
In modern Japan, nyotaimori is stigmatised and usually only found in sex clubs. Outside Japan, it has appeared at pop-up restaurant events in Britain and at certain restaurants and caterers in North America, the most popular and widely publicised example being in 2003 at the Bonzai pub and bistro in Seattle. The practice has attracted controversy and protests among conservatives, feminists, and human rights activists. It has been criticized as being decadent, humiliating, degrading, cruel, antiquated, objectifying, and sexist. Several countries have banned it. For example, in 2005, China outlawed nyotaimori on naked bodies due to public health concerns and moral issues.

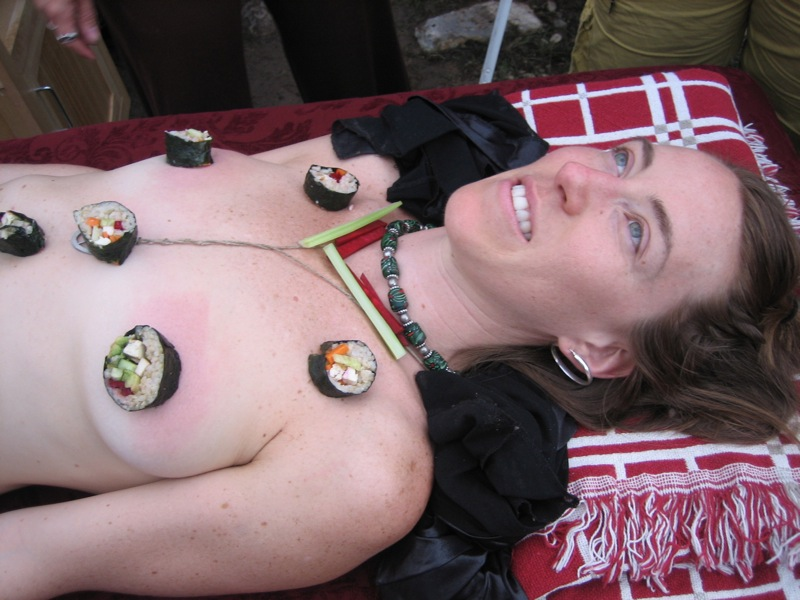
Woman as a model for nyotaimori at Burning Flipside event

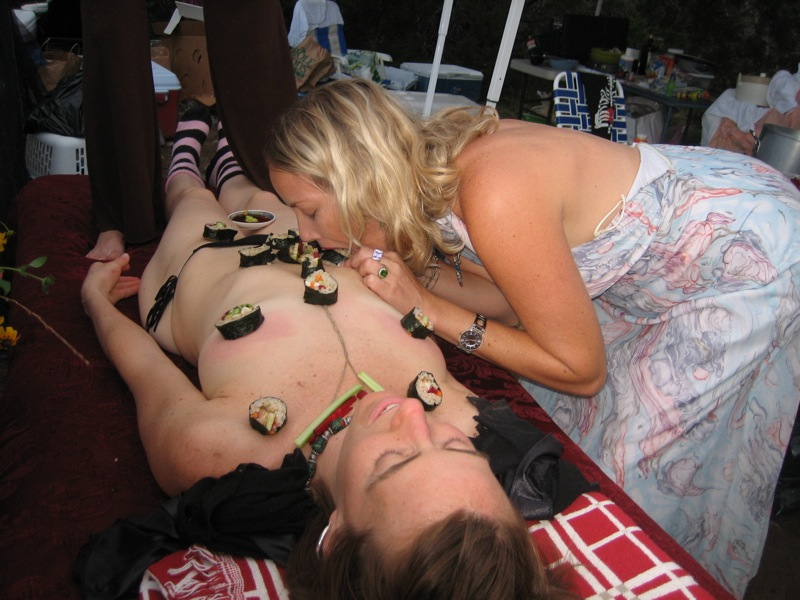
Guest eating sushi directly from a model's body at Burning Flipside event (USA, 2007) in Western style nyotaimori with the model wearing a G-string

== In popular culture ==
Nyotaimori was featured in the 1993 film Rising Sun and the 2012 film Sushi Girl.

== See also ==
- Breastaurant
- Human furniture
