= Georg Rosen =

Georg or George Rosen may refer to:

- Georg Rosen (1821–1891), German Orientalist and diplomat
- Georg Rosen (1895–1961), his grandson, German lawyer and diplomat
- Georg von Rosen (1843–1923), Swedish painter
- George Rosen (physician) (1910–1977), American physician and public health administrator
