= Adele von Finck =

German artist

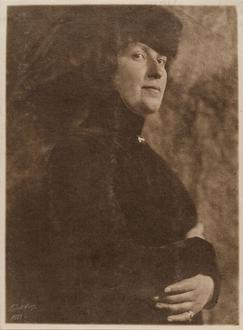
- Ada von Finck in Hamburg 1908
- Born: 6 February 1879; Buenos Aires, Argentina
- Died: 22 November 1943 (aged 64); Berlin, Germany
- Known for: Painting

Adele von Finck (1879-1943) was a German artist from a noble family in Danzig.

== Biography, education, and work ==
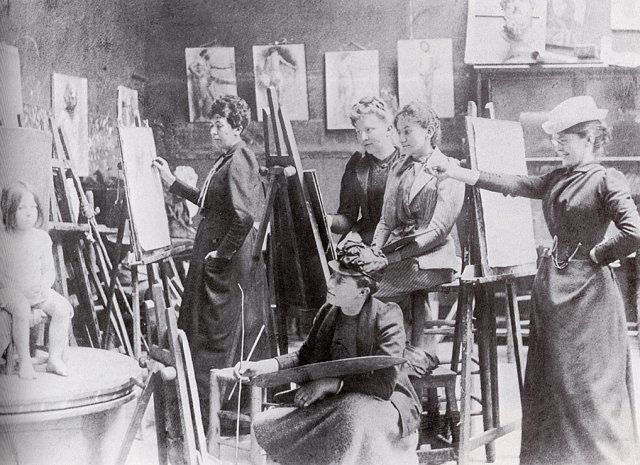
Ida Gerhardi (standing, 1st from right), Julie Wolfthorn (seated, 2nd from right), Jelka Rosen (standing, 3rd from right), Adele von Finck (bottom center), Dora Hitz (standing, 1st from left) as art students at Académie Colarossi, Montparnasse, Paris (circa 1892)

Von Finck was born on 6 February 1879 in Buenos Aires, Argentina. She attended the Akademie der Bildenden Künste München (Academy of Fine Arts, Munich) and the Académie Royale des Beaux-Arts in Brussels. Her teachers included Gustave-Claude-Etienne Courtois, Franz von Lenbach, and Jean-François Portaels. She exhibited her work in Prague and Berlin. In search of instruction in contemporary techniques for women, female painters such as Käthe Kollwitz, Sonia Delaunay, Annemarie Kruse, Ida Gerhardi, Paula Modersohn-Becker, Ottilie Wilhelmine Roederstein, Jelka Rosen, Dora Hitz, Maria Slavona, Ottilie Reylaender, Hedwig Woermann, and Julie Wolfthorn.

Following her time in Paris, Finck held an exhibition in Lüdenscheid in 1902 together with Ida Gerhardi and Jelka Rosen. The Lüdenscheid Municipal Gallery used this as an opportunity for a 2012 exhibition entitled Ida Gerhardi: German Women Artists in Paris around 1900, which also included works by Finck.

Finck's work is thematically oriented towards salon painting of the late 19th century, using impressionistic color schemes, as seen in the paintings Lute Player, Daydreaming, and Reading. She also incorporated elements of Art Nouveau, as in Worpswede Evening from 1904.

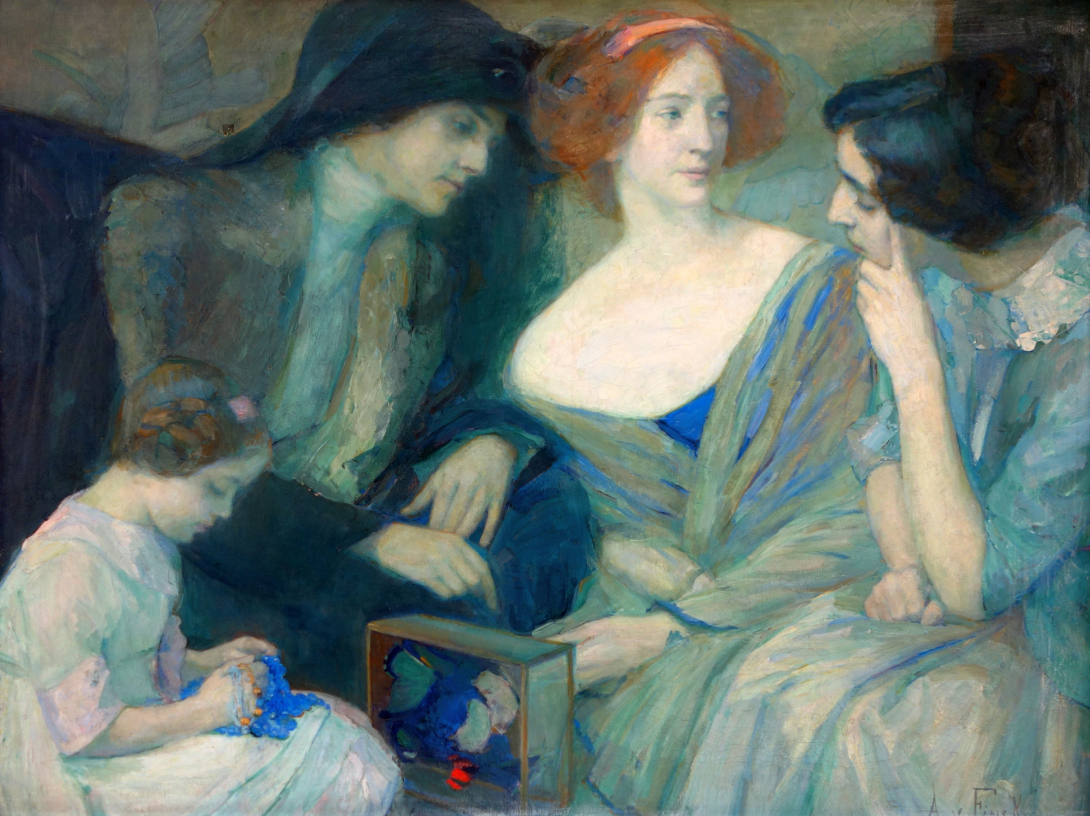
Women in Conversation (1916)

Paula Modersohn-Becker was inspired by Finck’s experiences in her desire to study in Paris. She also wrote about a visit by Julie Wolfthorn and Adele von Finck to Worpswede:

"The ladies in trousers prove their masculinity through boyish ravenousness. I find it very enjoyable to observe these individuals, both inside and out. I think they truly believe they are not vain and don't care about appearances. And yet they are as proud of their trousers as we are of a new dress." — Paula Modersohn-Becker

In some paintings, Finck drew inspiration from the Pre-Raphaelites, as in Angel with the Flame. From 1920 onward, she began using more vibrant colors, as seen in Flower Still Life (1924) and Little Japanese Girl (1931).

She soon began presenting her work at national and international exhibitions. In 1903 and from 1907 to 1913, she was represented at the Great Berlin Art Exhibitions with genre paintings. In 1904, she took part in the annual exhibition in Prague with the landscape paintings Bornholm Cliffs and Worpswede Evening. Finck was also one of the first members of the German Artists' Association, founded in 1903. In 1905, she exhibited at its second exhibition on Kurfürstendamm in Berlin. In 1909, she showed the painting The Green Hat at the annual exhibition of the Glass Palace in Munich. In 1910, she exhibited Innocence and Lifeworld at the German Artists' Association exhibition at the Mathildenhöhe in Darmstadt. That same year, she also took part in the 37th exhibition of the Association of Austrian Visual Artists at the Vienna Secession building. In 1909, she participated in the Munich art salon Zimmermann with various female nudes. In 1910, she exhibited at Fritz Gurlitt’s gallery in Berlin, and in 1913 at the Kunstverein in Munich.

Finck's paintings became known to a wider audience through the magazines Die Kunst, Jugend, and Westermanns Monatshefte.

Finck was a member of the Association of Berlin Women Artists, established in 1867. In 2017, the association organized the exhibition Fortsetzung folgt! ("To Be Continued!"), which included paintings by Finck to mark its 150th anniversary. The city of Berlin also purchased one of her figure paintings. later undertook study trips to Italy. Berlin was the center of her life until her death. From 1907, Finck lived at Kurfürstenstrasse 50, the same house as Julie Wolfthorn and her sister Luise Wolf.

She died on 22 November 1943 in Berlin, Germany.

== Gallery ==
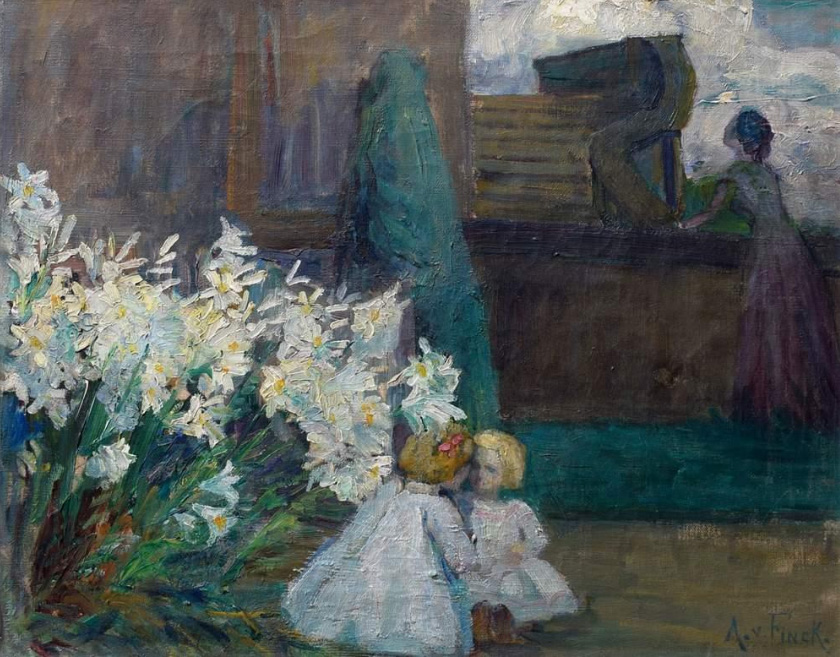
On the Balcony

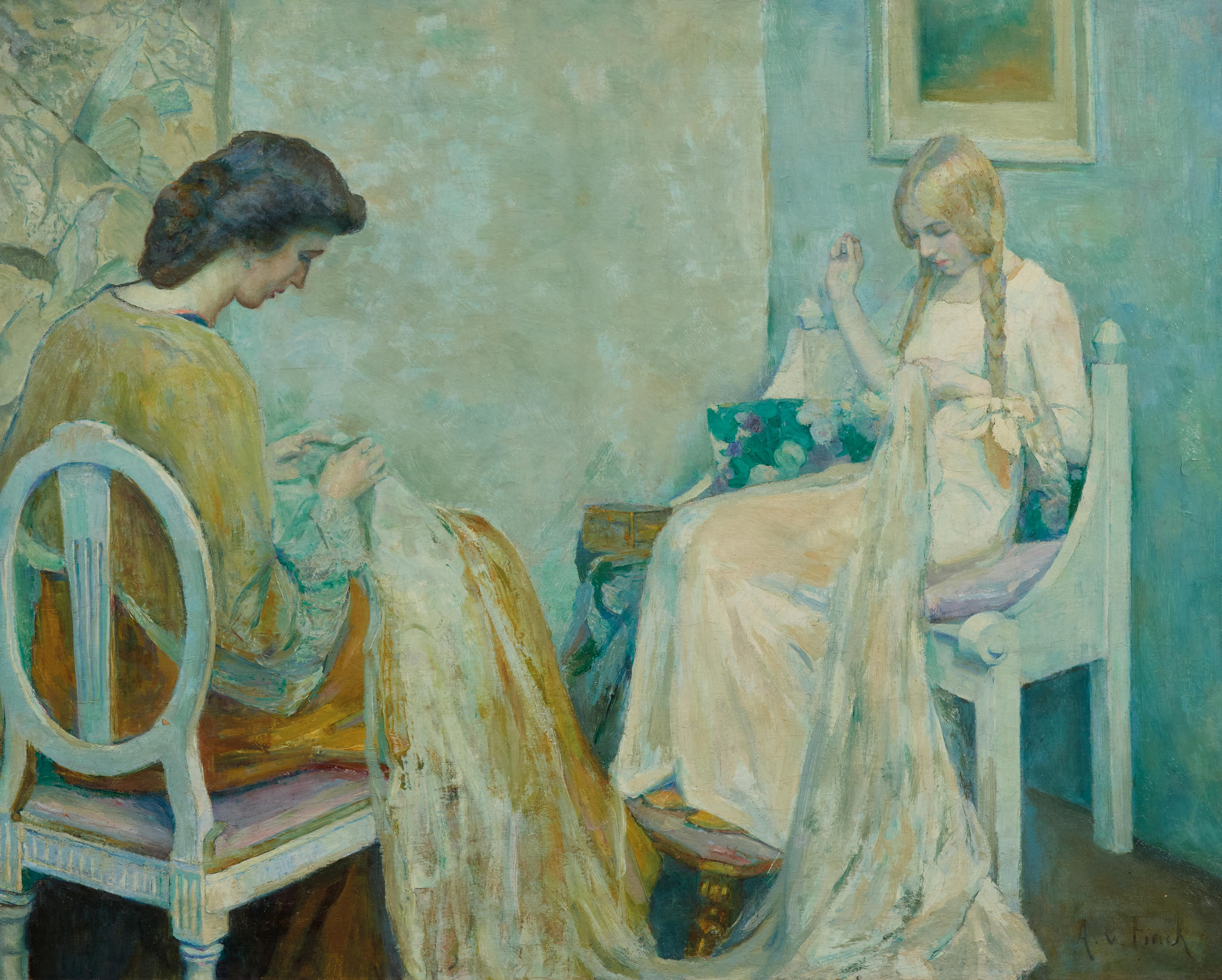
Two Women Sewing

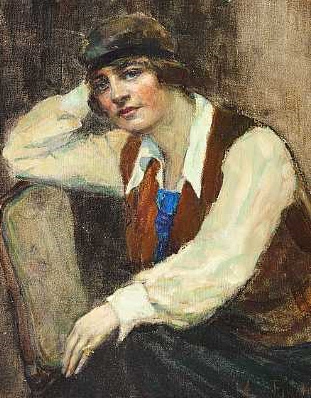
Portrait of a woman, cut and dressed after 1920s fashion with shirt, vest, tie and headband

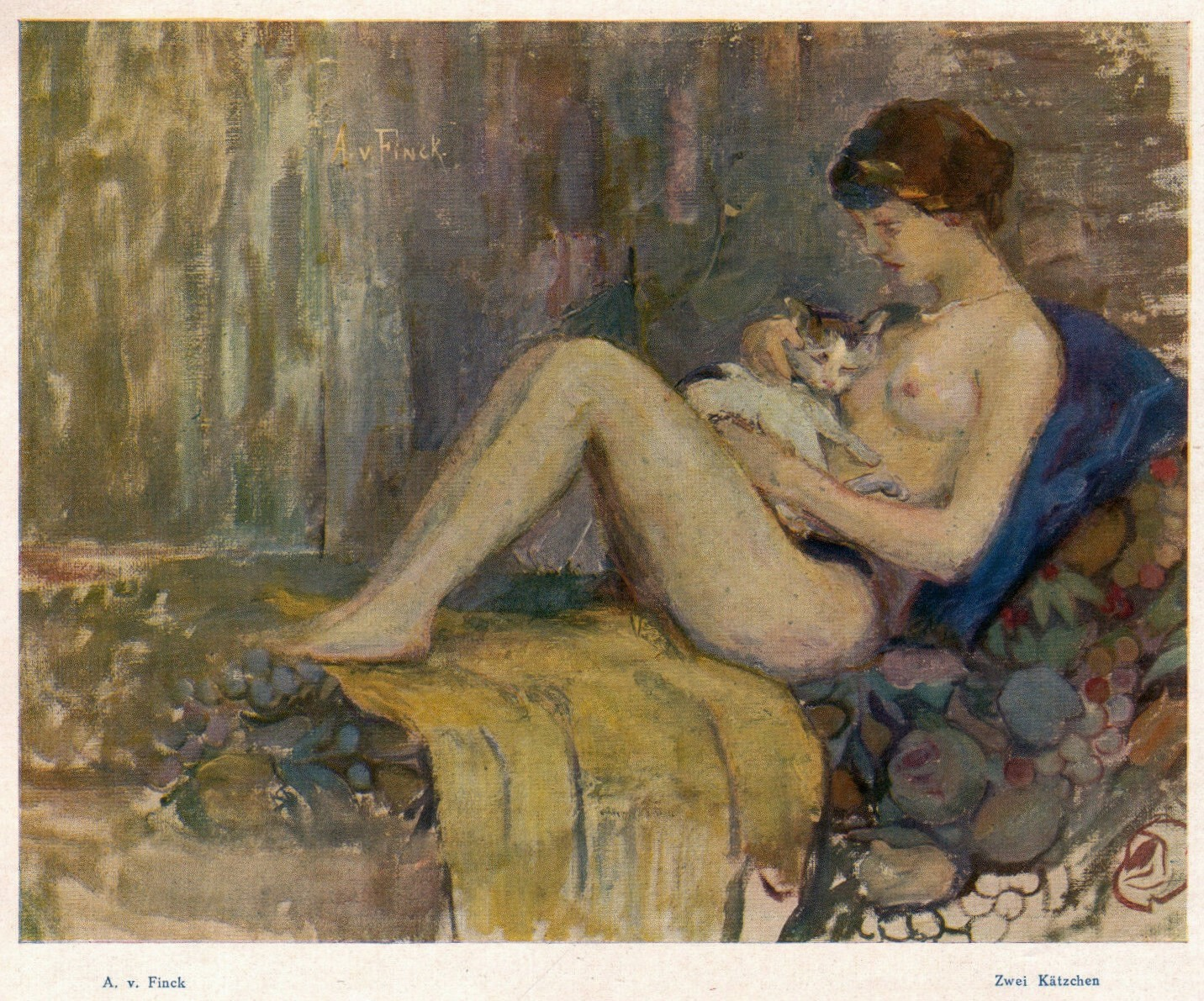
Two Kittens (1924)

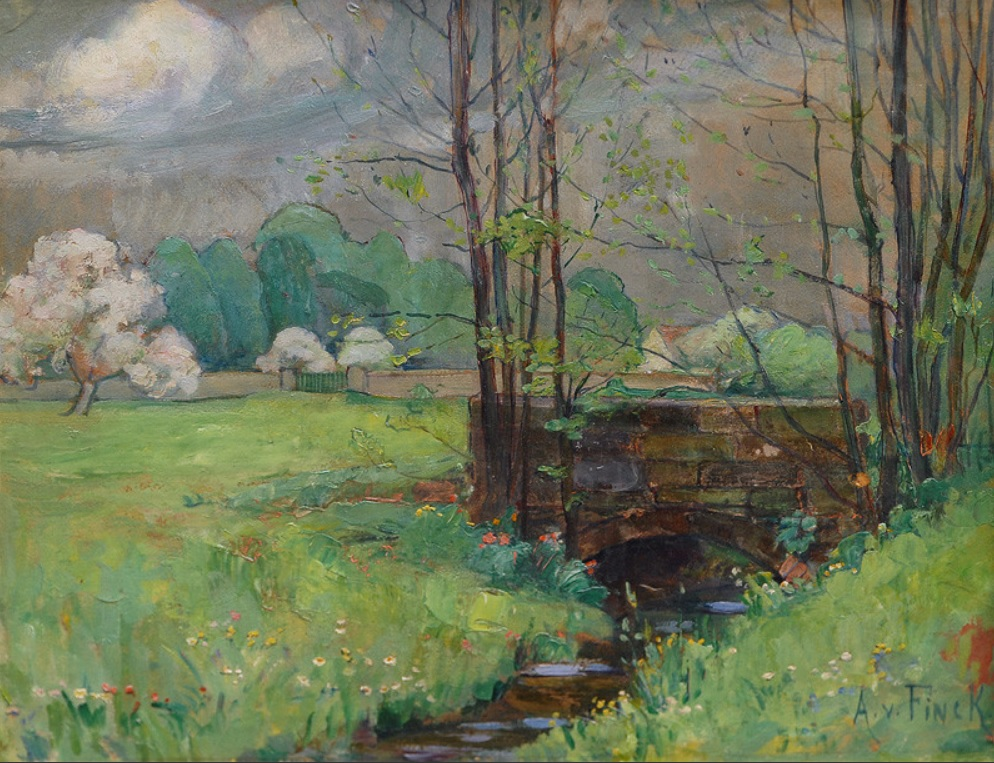
River Landscape in Spring
