= Jelka Rosen =

German painter

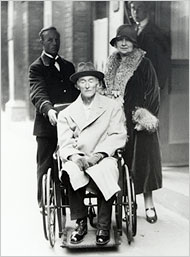
Jelka Rosen with husband Frederick Delius in 1929

Helene Sophie Emilie Rosen, later known as Jelka Delius (30 December 1868 – 28 May 1935), was a German painter, best known as the wife of the English composer Frederick Delius.

She was born in Belgrade in 1868. She was the youngest of five children born to Georg Rosen (1820−1891) (Note: Professor Georg Rosen (originally Ballhorn), of Danish extraction, born in Detmold, Principality of Lippe, on 24 September 1820, was a diplomat, Orientalist, linguist and author. He knew Sanskrit, Armenian, Turkish, Arabic and Persian. Accompanied Alexander von Humboldt on an linguistic-ethnographical expedition to 1843 to Tiflis and the Caucasus. Interpreter at the Prussian embassy in Constantinople 1844, Prussian consul in Jerusalem (1852-67). He collected Bulgarian and Croat folksongs during his time in Belgrade as Consul-General for the North German Confederation. Author of 'History of Turkey, 1826-1856' and "Türkje bilürmisiniz?" (Do you understand Turkish?), (1891). Died Detmold, 29 October 1891. Source: Pelger 2005, pp. 51–2 He and his half-brother Friedrich August Rosen (a friend of Felix Mendelssohn and Wilhelm von Humboldt) were the founders of modern Oriental studies in Germany.) and his wife Serena Anna Moscheles (1830−1902), also a painter, and daughter of the composer Ignaz Moscheles.

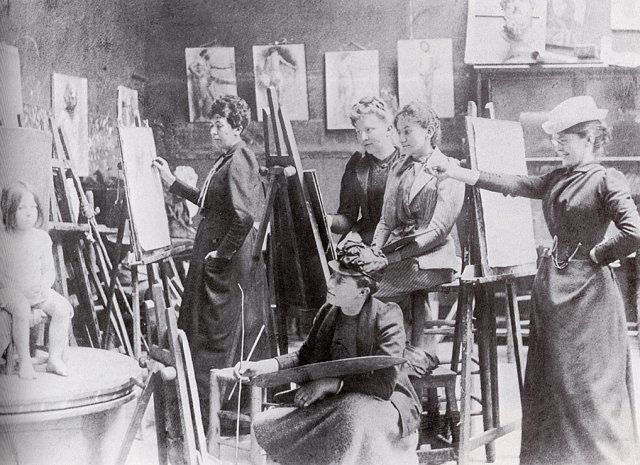
Ida Gerhardi (standing, 1st from right), Julie Wolfthorn (seated, 2nd from right), Jelka Rosen (standing, 3rd from right), Adele von Finck (bottom center), Dora Hitz (standing, 1st from left) as art students at Académie Colarossi, Montparnasse, Paris (circa 1892)

Jelka Rosen studied art from 1892 at the private Académie Colarossi in Paris, accompanied by her newly widowed mother. Living in Montparnasse, she made the acquaintance of the composers Gabriel Fauré, Maurice Ravel and Florent Schmitt and artists Auguste Rodin, Camille Claudel, Paul Gauguin, Henri Rousseau, Edvard Munch and Ida Gerhardi.

She exhibited at the Salon des Indépendants. She met Frederick Delius at a dinner party on 16 January 1896, and found they had a shared interest in the writings of Friedrich Nietzsche (Note: Her father, who knew Persian (see Pelger 2005, pp. 51–2,) would have known about Zoroaster; Delius set words from Nietszche's 'Thus Spoke Zarathustra' in his Mass of Life (1907).) and the music of Edvard Grieg. In 1897 Delius returned from business in Florida, where he had managed an orange plantation twelve years previously; he moved into her newly acquired house in Grez-sur-Loing, a house she owned with her mother, and they married in September 1903. She was heiress to a modest fortune from her distinguished Schleswig-Holstein family and her wealth gave Delius financial security.

Through her parental heritage, Jelka was widely read and spoke a number of languages, and it was she who often suggested texts her husband could set to music. She identified the works of Ernest Dowson for his Songs of Sunset, and Walt Whitman for Songs of Farewell. Her German translations of these texts were often published along with the music. Her artistic skills were also invaluable in sketching designs for the scenery in Sir Thomas Beecham's 1920 revival of A Village Romeo and Juliet. Her own artwork appeared on the vocal score to Fennimore and Gerda.

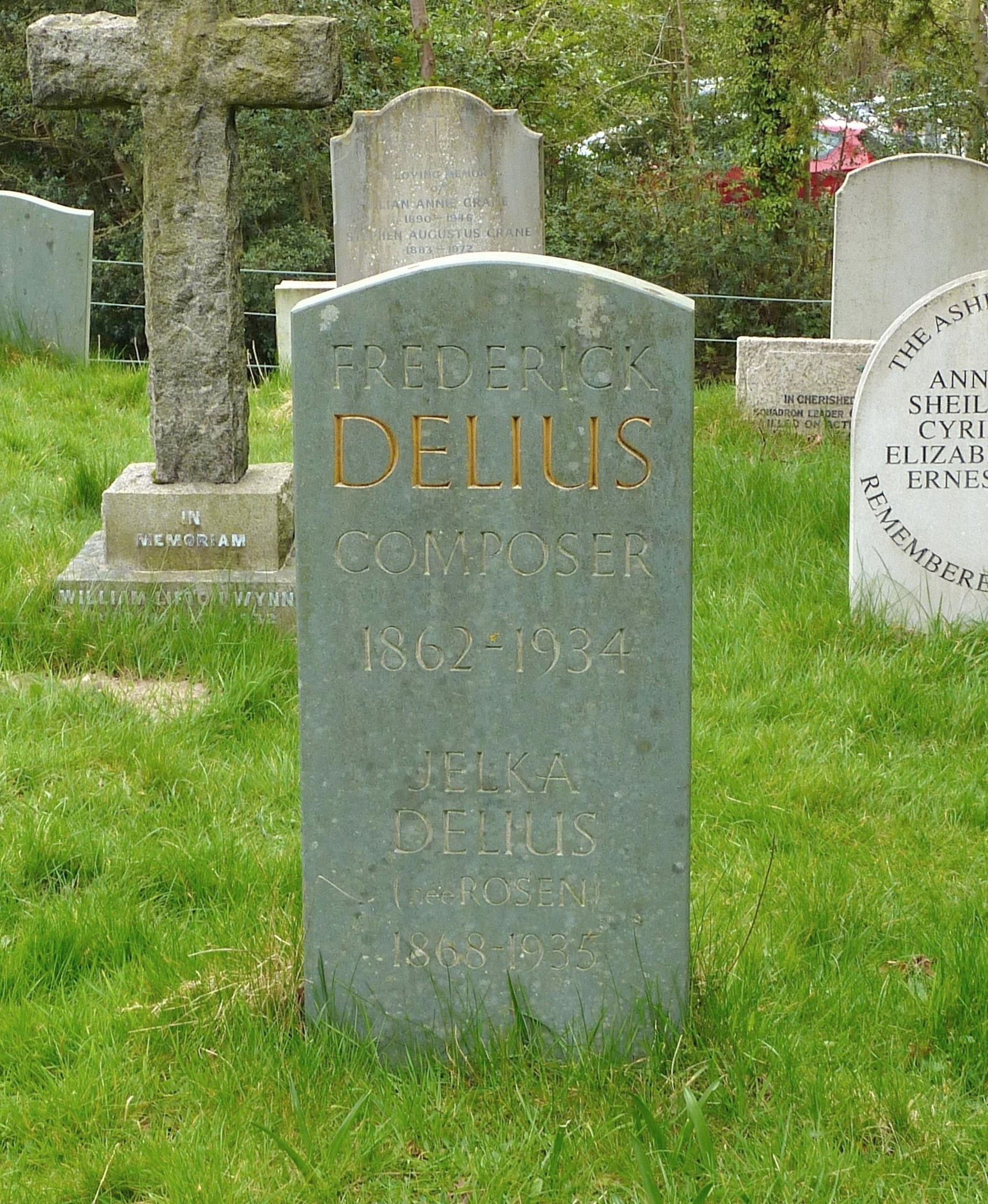
The grave of Frederick and Jelka Delius at St Peter's Church in Limpsfield, Surrey, England

She remained devoted to Delius despite his affairs with other women. In the last twelve years of Delius's life, after he became blind and paralysed with third-stage syphilis, she gave up her work to be his caregiver. She herself became ill with bowel cancer, and made it known that outside help would be welcome. This led to Eric Fenby offering his services to the composer as an amanuensis, but he often served as Delius's personal nurse. Fenby worked with Delius for six years, during which time Jelka had intermittent absences for medical treatment. She underwent an operation in Fontainebleau in May 1934, but returned from a nursing home where she was recuperating to be at Delius's side when he died in June 1934. Delius had wished to be buried in the garden of their home at Grez-sur-Loing, or failing that, in England. The local authorities would not permit a garden burial, and Jelka was too ill to travel, so Delius was buried in the local cemetery at Grez.

In autumn 1934, with her health stabilised following the operation in May, she visited London as the guest of honour at concerts of Delius' music conducted by Sir Thomas Beecham on 24 October and 8 November. By May 1935, however, her health was deteriorating once again. Nevertheless, she felt she had enough strength to undertake the Channel crossing to attend his reinterment in the churchyard of the Church of Saint Peter, Limpsfield, Surrey, setting out on 22 May. However, en route she contracted pneumonia and was hospitalised in Dover on arrival in England. She was then transferred to a hospital in Kensington, London, and was unable to attend the reburial on 26 May. The BBC recorded the service, and Jelka was able to listen to excerpts from her hospital bed the following day. She died shortly afterwards, on 28 May 1935. She was buried with Delius: they share the same grave. Her estate funded a trust, managed by Beecham, to promote the works of Delius. Beecham is now buried a short distance away.

Jelka Rosen was portrayed by the British actress Maureen Pryor in the 1968 Ken Russell film Song of Summer.
