= Mathilde Battenberg =

German painter (1880-1943)

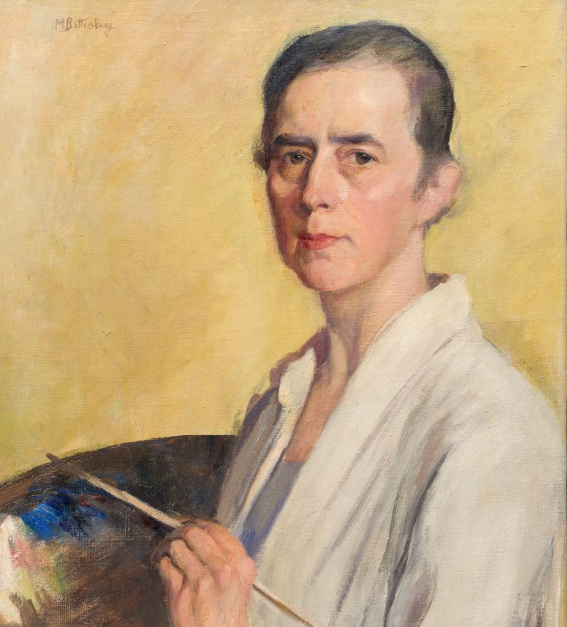
- self portrait ca. 1925
- Born: April 4, 1878; Alzey, Germany
- Died: August 13, 1936 (aged 58); Frankfurt, Germany
- Known for: Painting

Mathilde Battenberg (April 4, 1878 - August 13, 1936) was a German painter.

Battenberg was born on April 4, 1878 in Alzey. she studied with the painter Ottilie Roederstein (1859-1937) and then at the Académie Colarossi. She exhibited regularly at the Frankfurter Kunstverein (Frankfurt Art Association).

Battenberg died om August 13, 1936 in Frankfurt.

Her work is in the collection of the Städel museum.

== Gallery ==
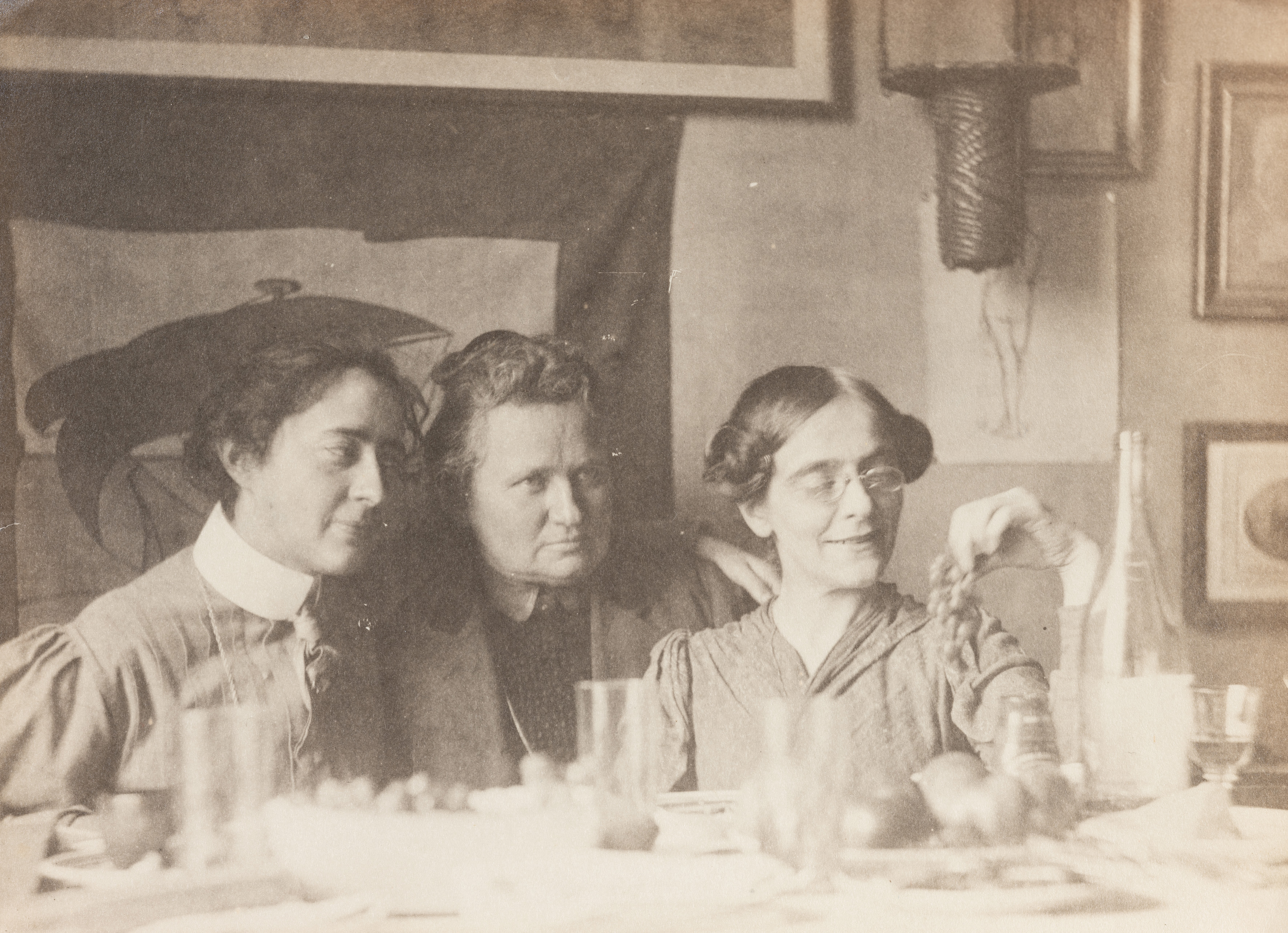
Mathilde Battenberg, Ottilie Roederstein and Ida Gerhardi in Roederstein’s studio at 108 Boulevard du Montparnasse, Paris

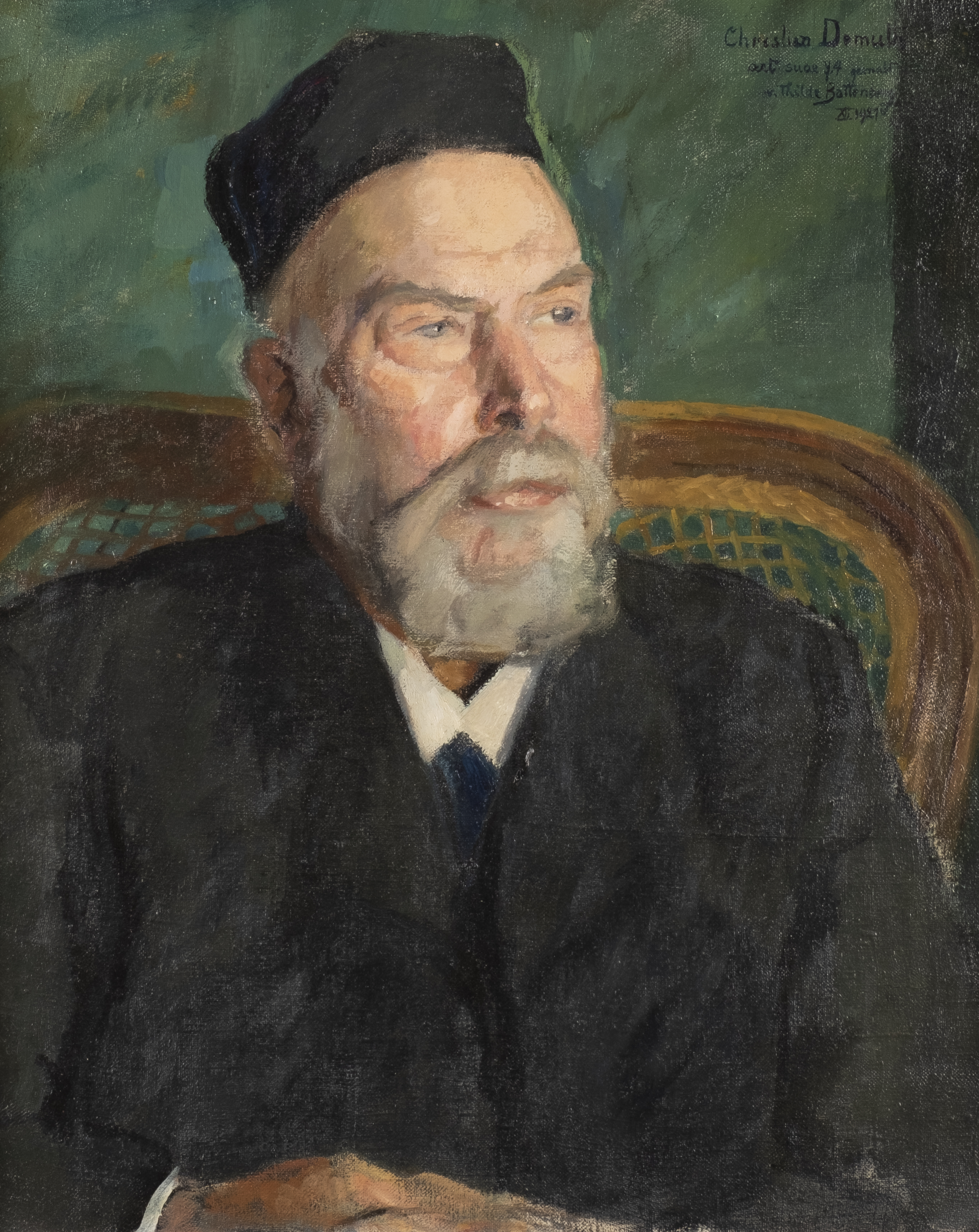
Portrait Christian Demuth, 1921

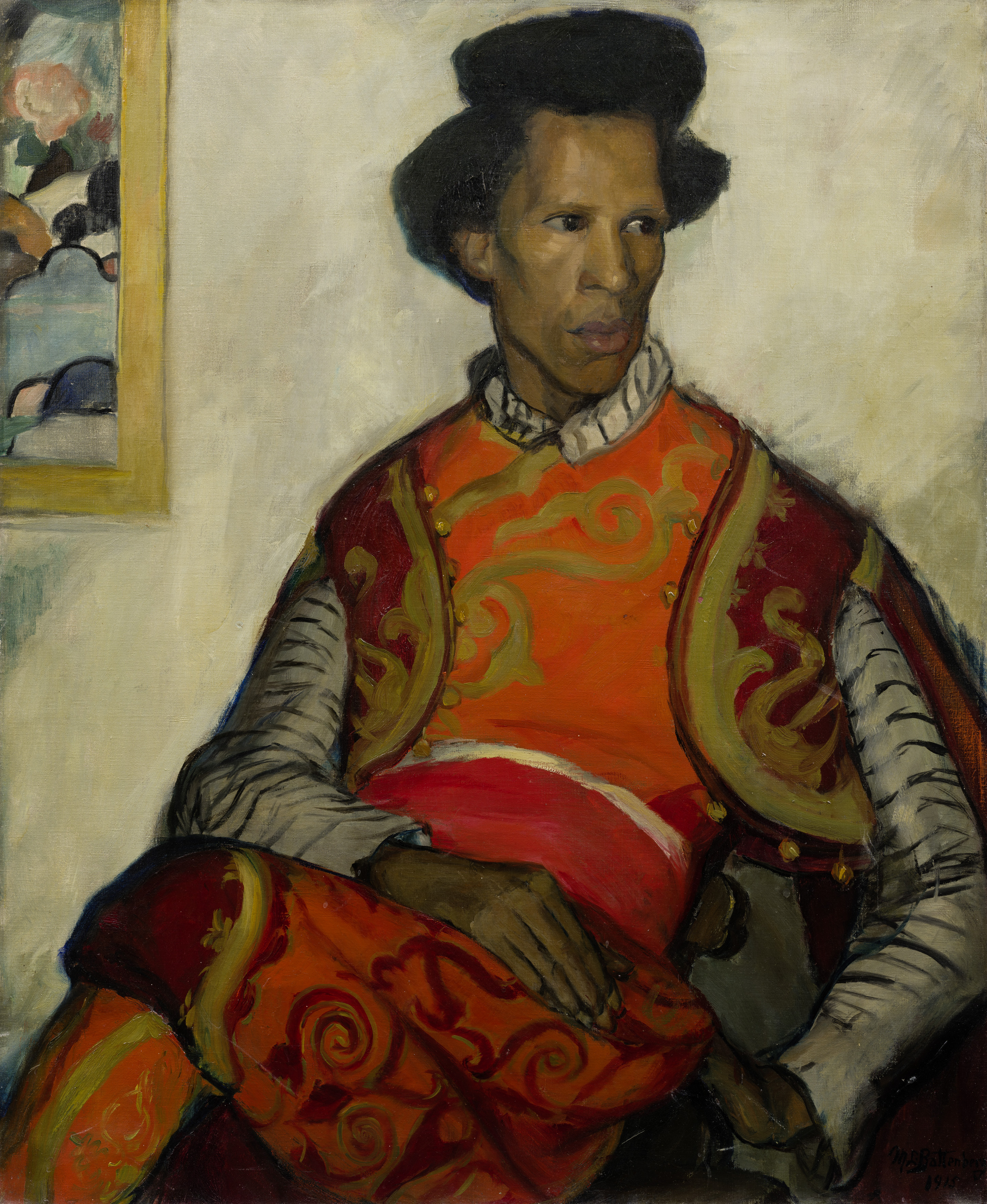
Portrait of an African Man, 1915
