= Friedrich Salomon Hall =

German hotel proprietor, tutor and spy

- Born: 1879
- Died: 1964 (aged 84–85)
- Occupations: Hotel proprietor, tutor and espionage agent
- Known for: Participation in the Seventh German Inner Africa Research Expedition

Friedrich Salomon Hall (1879–1964) was a German citizen with connections to Ethiopia. His parents lived in Ethiopia and served its emperor until they fell out of favour and moved to the Middle East after being rescued by the 1868 British Expedition to Abyssinia. Hall, born in the Middle East, moved to Ethiopia to join his mother who had returned there to serve the Royal Court. He became a hotel proprietor and tutor to Emperor Lij Iyassu. Hall afterwards left to act as an assistant to Julius Löytved-Hardegg, a German consul to the Ottoman Empire. During the early part of World War I Hall attempted to return to Ethiopia to negotiate with Lij Iyassu for Ethiopia's entry into the war. The espionage mission was disguised as the Seventh German Inner Africa Research Expedition but was detected by Italian authorities en-route and the participants returned home. Hall blamed the expedition leader Leo Frobenius for its failure. Hall attempted a second mission to carry messages to the German legation at Addis Ababa in June 1915 but was captured by the Italians and imprisoned for the remainder of the war.

== Early life ==
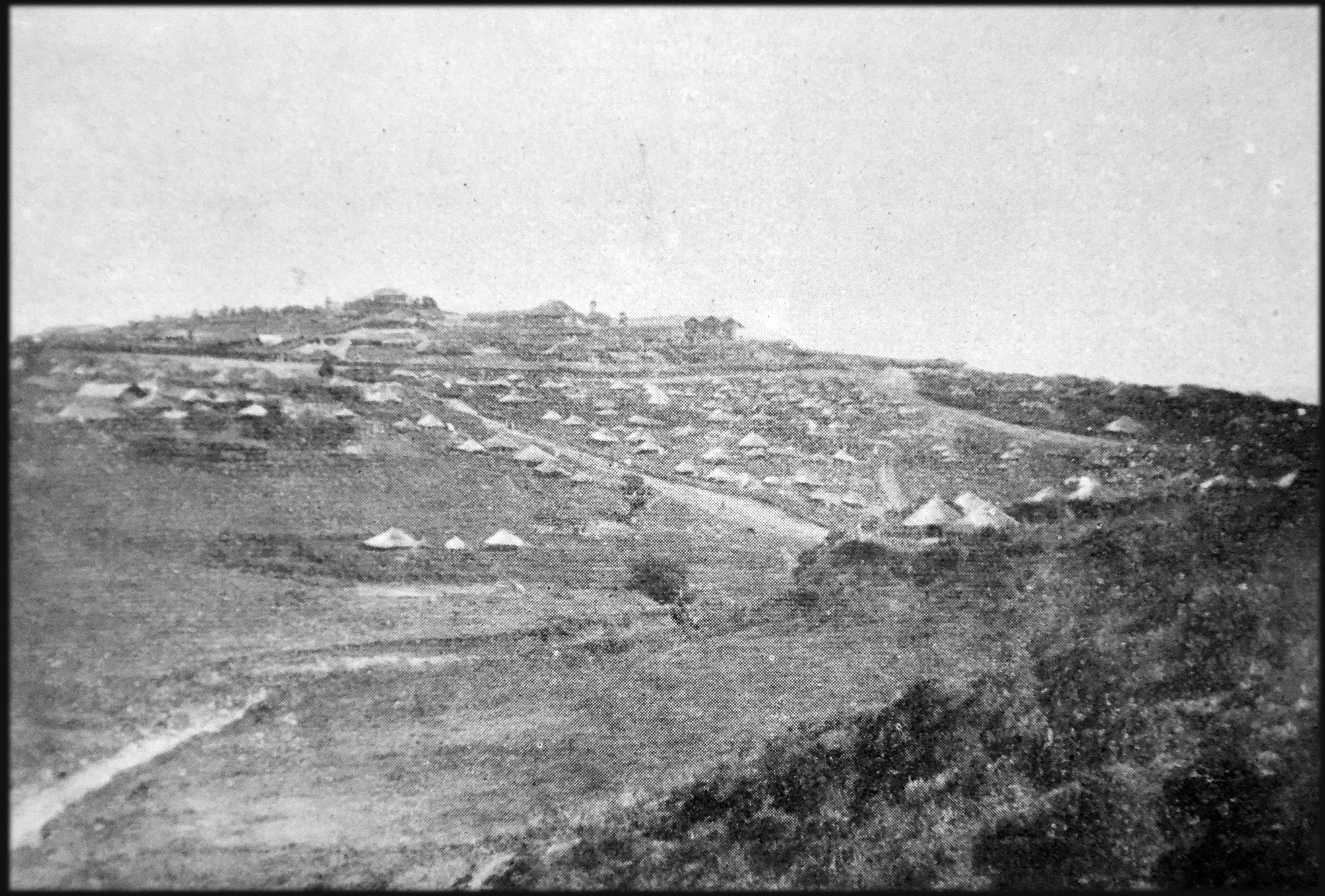
Early 20th-century Addis Ababa

Friedrich Salomon Hall's parents were Moritz and Katarina Hall. Moritz was born in Cracow in partitioned Poland and Katarina was born in Ethiopia to an Ethiopian mother and a German father. The couple met while Moritz was in Ethiopia as a missionary; he later produced cannon for the Ethiopian Emperor Tewodros II. He fell out of favour, was imprisoned by Tewodros and rescued by the 1868 British Expedition to Abyssinia. Friedrich was born in 1879, after his parents left Ethiopia and settled in the Middle East, and was the seventh of thirteen children. The family had moved to Jaffa in the Holy Land, which was then part of the Ottoman Empire.

Katarina Hall returned to Addis Ababa in 1902 and became a close confident of the Royal court. Friedrich joined Katarina in Ethiopia in 1906 and worked on a scheme to bring German settlers to the country. He founded and ran the Imperial Hotel in Addis Ababa, the first modern hotel in the Ethiopian capital. The Imperial had only basic amenities but these were said to be made up for by its excellent views. Friedrich Hall served as a tutor to Ethiopian emperor Lij Iyassu before returning to the Ottoman Empire. He served in the employ of Haifa's German consul Julius Löytved-Hardegg for which he received 800 German gold marks per month, remitting 200 marks to his wife who was then in Lausanne, Switzerland.

== Seventh German Inner Africa Research Expedition ==
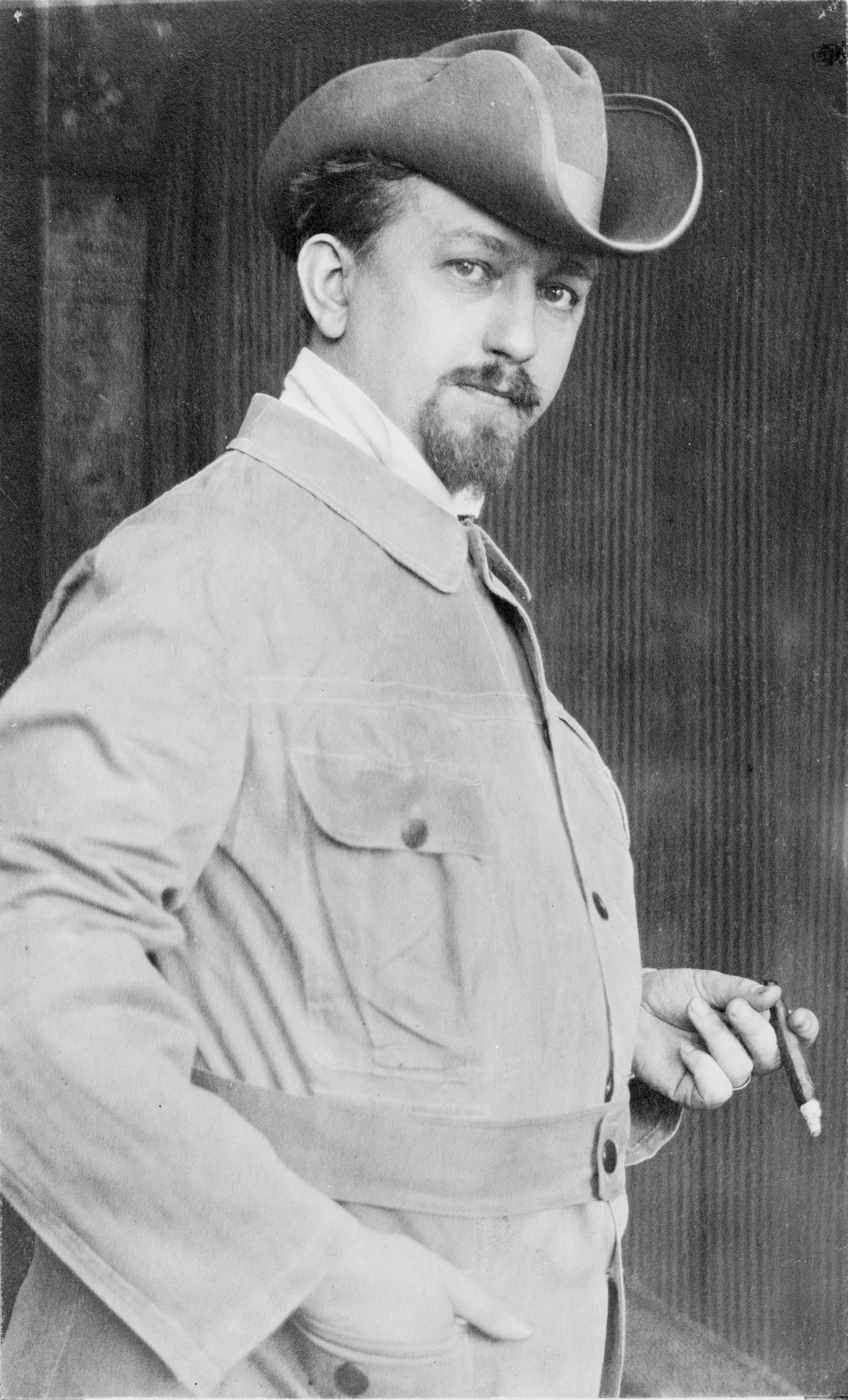
Leo Frobenius, expedition leader

Hall was a participant on the October 1914 to March 1915 Seventh German Inner Africa Research Expedition, a German World War I military espionage mission disguised as a scientific expedition. The expedition was commanded by German ethnologist Leo Frobenius and had the objectives of restoring communication with the German legation in Ethiopia; persuading Ethiopian emperor Lij Iyasu to support the Central Powers and instigating revolt in Anglo-Egyptian Sudan. Hall had been preparing his own mission to Ethiopia but, at the suggestion of Löytved-Hardegg, his mission was subsumed into the Frobenius expedition. Löytved-Hardegg did not believe Hall was sufficiently qualified to lead an independent mission but believed his knowledge of the region would be beneficial to Frobenius, who had led previous expeditions to African but never to Ethiopia. By another account Hall was attached to the expedition at the insistence of the Ottoman Empire, Germany's allies in the war; indeed the expedition records list him as an Ottoman subject, though he held German citizenship.

Hall served as interpreter for the expedition and would have led negotiations with Lij Iyasu in Ethiopia. However the expedition never reached the country; it was discovered by the Italian authorities in Eritrea and the members escorted back to their home nations. Hall had disagreed frequently with Frobenius over his conduct of the expedition and blamed him for its failure. Hall claimed Frobenius blew his cover (he travelled disguised as an Arab) by insisting on accompanying him with the entire expedition, whereas Hall claimed the agreement was that he would proceed alone to Ethiopia. Hall formally complained about Frobenius to Löytved-Hardegg upon his return to Jaffa on 2 April. Hall was granted 653.90 marks as compensation for his participation in the expedition.

== Later career ==
Hall carried out a follow-up expedition to Ethiopia in June 1915, acting as a courier to deliver correspondence with the German legation in Addis Ababa. Italy had entered the war in May 1915 by attacking Germany's ally Austria-Hungary, though they remained neutral with Germany until August 1916. Hall, again travelling disguised as an Arab, had roused the suspicions of an Italian policeman by the corns on his feet, which showed that he normally wore European shoes, rather than Arab sandals. He was arrested after he used the German exclamation "hoppla!" when he tripped over, though he managed to destroy the secret correspondence before his capture. Hall spent the remainder of the war in Italian custody and through this period the German legation remained out of communication with the government in Berlin.

Hall died in 1964.
