= Dora Hitz =

German painter

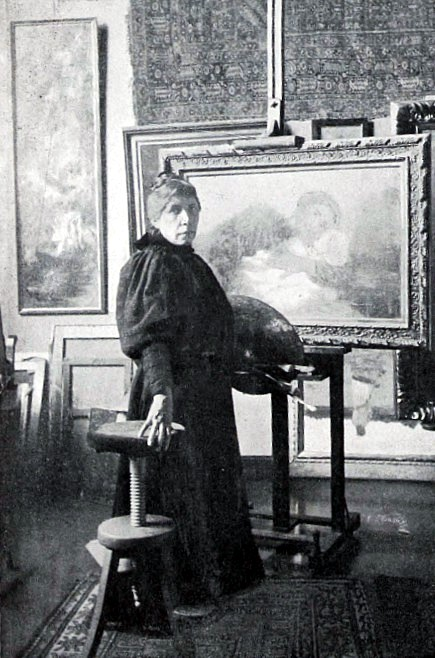
- Dora Hitz in her studio (1898)
- Born: March 30, 1856; Altdorf bei Nürnberg, Kingdom of Bavaria
- Died: November 20, 1924 (aged 68); Berlin, Germany
- Known for: Painting
- Movement: Berlin Secession

Dora Hitz (30 March 1856 – 20 November 1924) was a Court Painter to the Romanian Royal Family, a member of the November Group and co-founder of the Berlin Secession.

== Life ==
She was born in Altdorf bei Nürnberg. When she was six years old, her family moved to Ansbach and at thirteen she was sent to Munich to study at the "Damenmalschule der Frau Staatsrat Weber", an art school for young women, where she studied with Wilhelm von Lindenschmit the Younger. At the Art and Industrial Exhibition of 1876, she met and became acquainted with Elisabeth of Wied, the Queen consort of Romania (perhaps better known under her literary name "Carmen Sylva"). As a result, Hitz was appointed as the Court Painter. In addition to oil paintings and book illustrations, she also created fresco murals in the Music Hall of Peleș Castle in Sinaia.

After 1880, she lived in Paris, where she studied with Luc-Olivier Merson, Gustave Courtois, Jean-Joseph Benjamin-Constant and Eugène Carrière, who had the most influence on her style. She spent 1886/87 in Romania, then returned to Paris, becoming friends with Eugen Jettel and Hermann Bahr. She travelled throughout Brittany and Normandy and, in 1890, became a member of the Salon of the Société des Artistes Français. From 1892, she was a regular participant in the exhibitions of the Société Nationale des Beaux Arts.

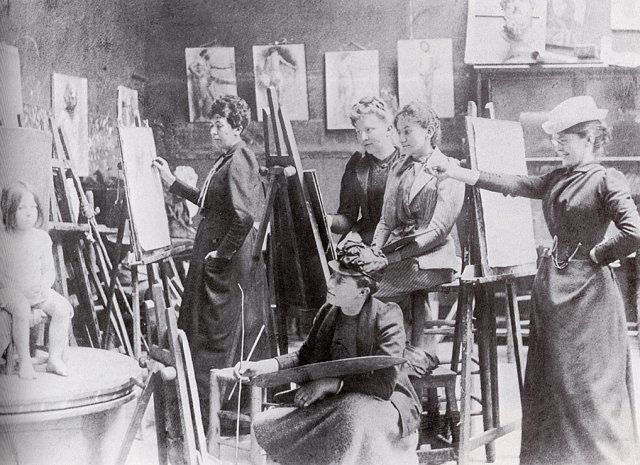
Ida Gerhardi (standing, 1st from right), Julie Wolfthorn (seated, 2nd from right), Jelka Rosen (standing, 3rd from right), Adele von Finck (bottom center), Dora Hitz (standing, 1st from left) as art students at Académie Colarossi, Montparnasse, Paris (circa 1892)

Although she had been and would continue to be successful in Paris, she moved to Berlin in 1892 and joined the "Vereins Berliner Künstlerinnen und Kunstfreundinnen" (an association of female artists) that gave her access to many upper middle-class clients who commissioned portraits. She founded a women's art school in 1894, operated a studio and struck up a friendship with Käthe Kollwitz. Hitz exhibited her work at the Woman's Building at the 1893 World's Columbian Exposition in Chicago, Illinois. In 1898, she was one of the founding members of the Berlin Secession. She was awarded the Villa Romana Prize in 1906, which included a stipendium that enabled her to spend a year in Florence.

During World War I she began to experience financial difficulties, fell ill, and gradually became a recluse. She died in Berlin in 1924.

== Selected paintings ==
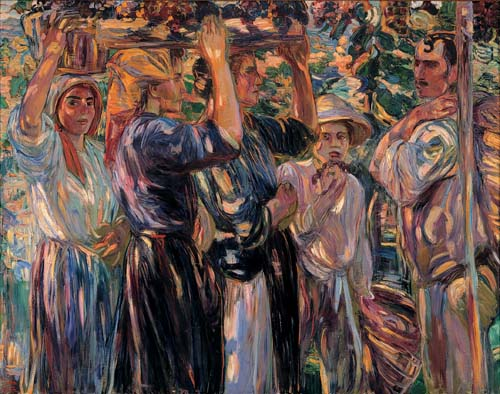
Grape Harvest

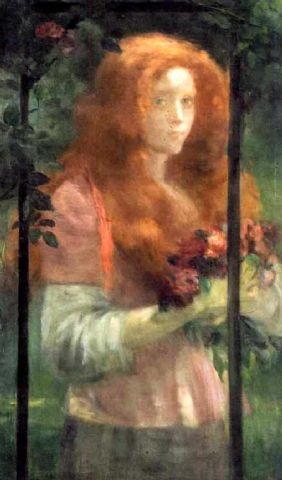
Twilight

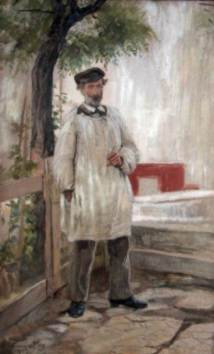
Portrait of the painter
Edmond Aman-Jean

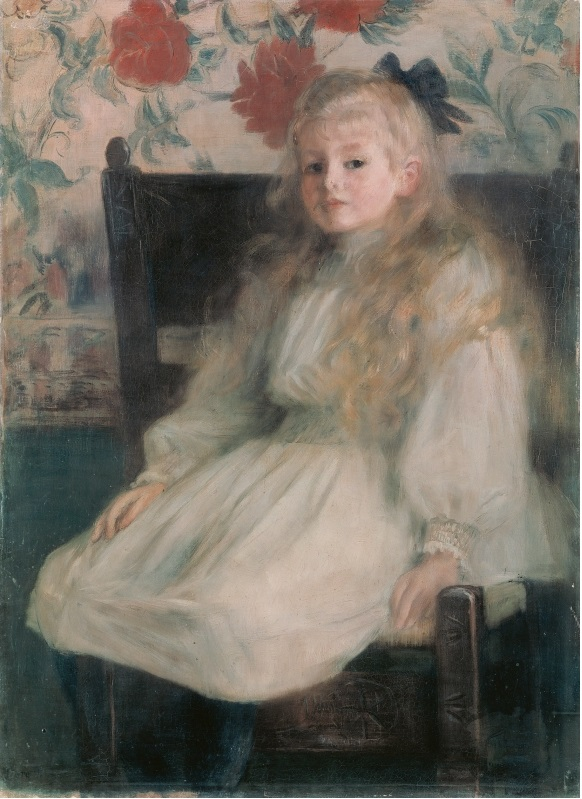
Portrait of a Girl

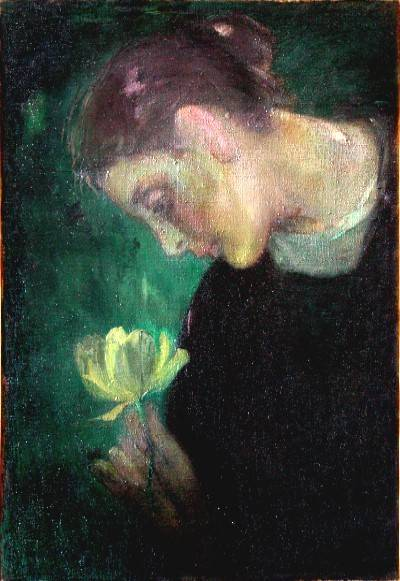
The Cauliflower
