= Julie Wolfthorn =

German painter

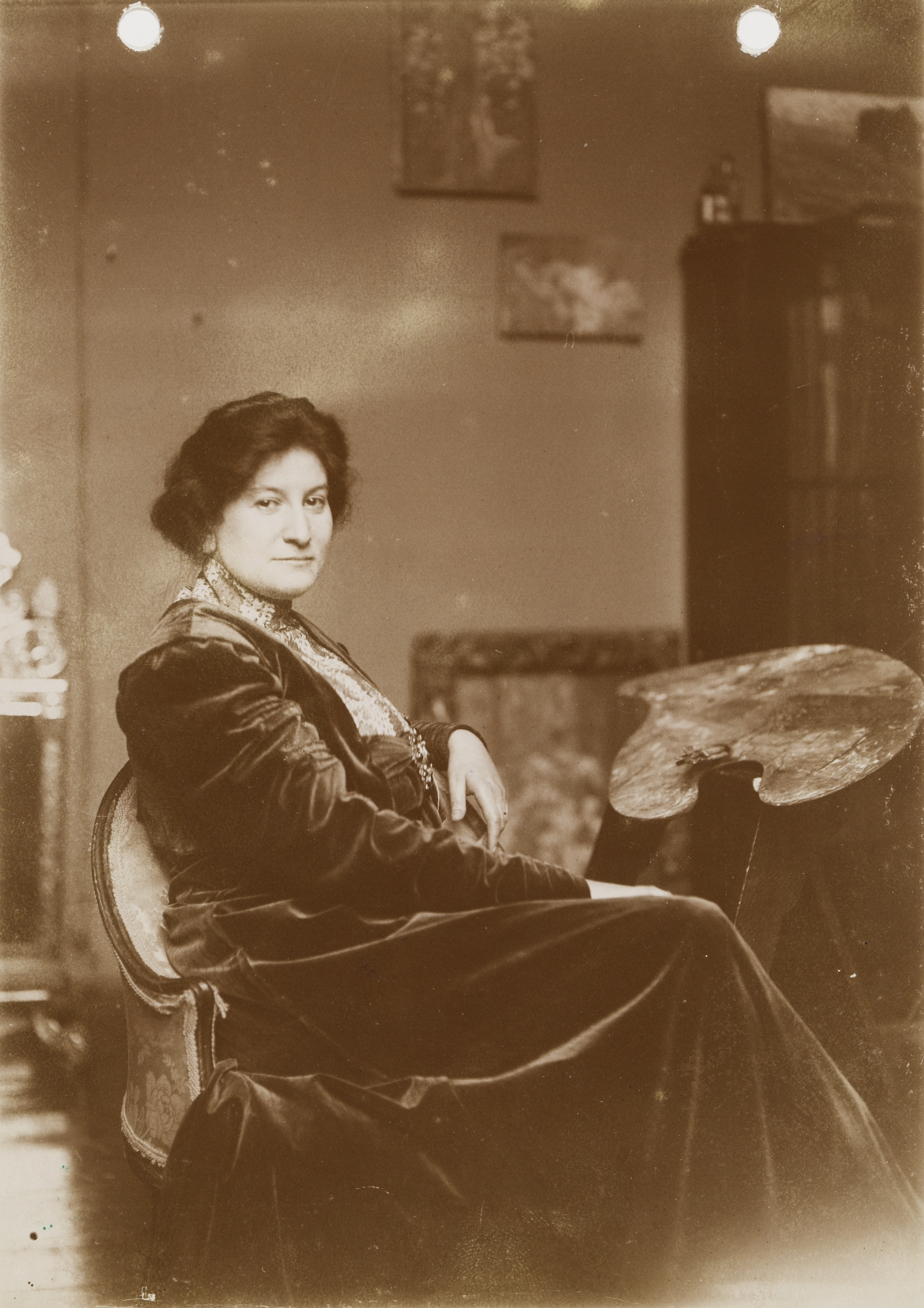
Julie Wolfthorn, 1906

Julie Wolfthorn (8 January 1864 – 26 December 1944) was a German painter. Born as Julie Wolf(f) to a middle-class Jewish family, she later styled herself as Julie Wolfthorn after Thorn (Toruń), her city of birth.

== Life ==
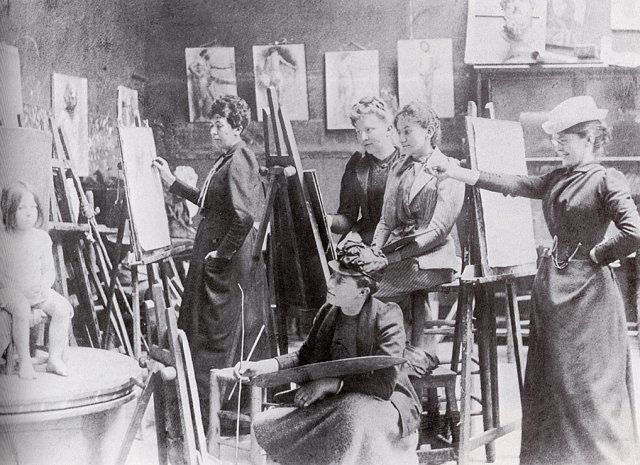
Ida Gerhardi (standing, 1st from right), Julie Wolfthorn (seated, 2nd from right), Jelka Rosen (standing, 3rd from right), Adele von Finck (bottom center), Dora Hitz (standing, 1st from left) as art students at Académie Colarossi, Montparnasse, Paris (circa 1892)

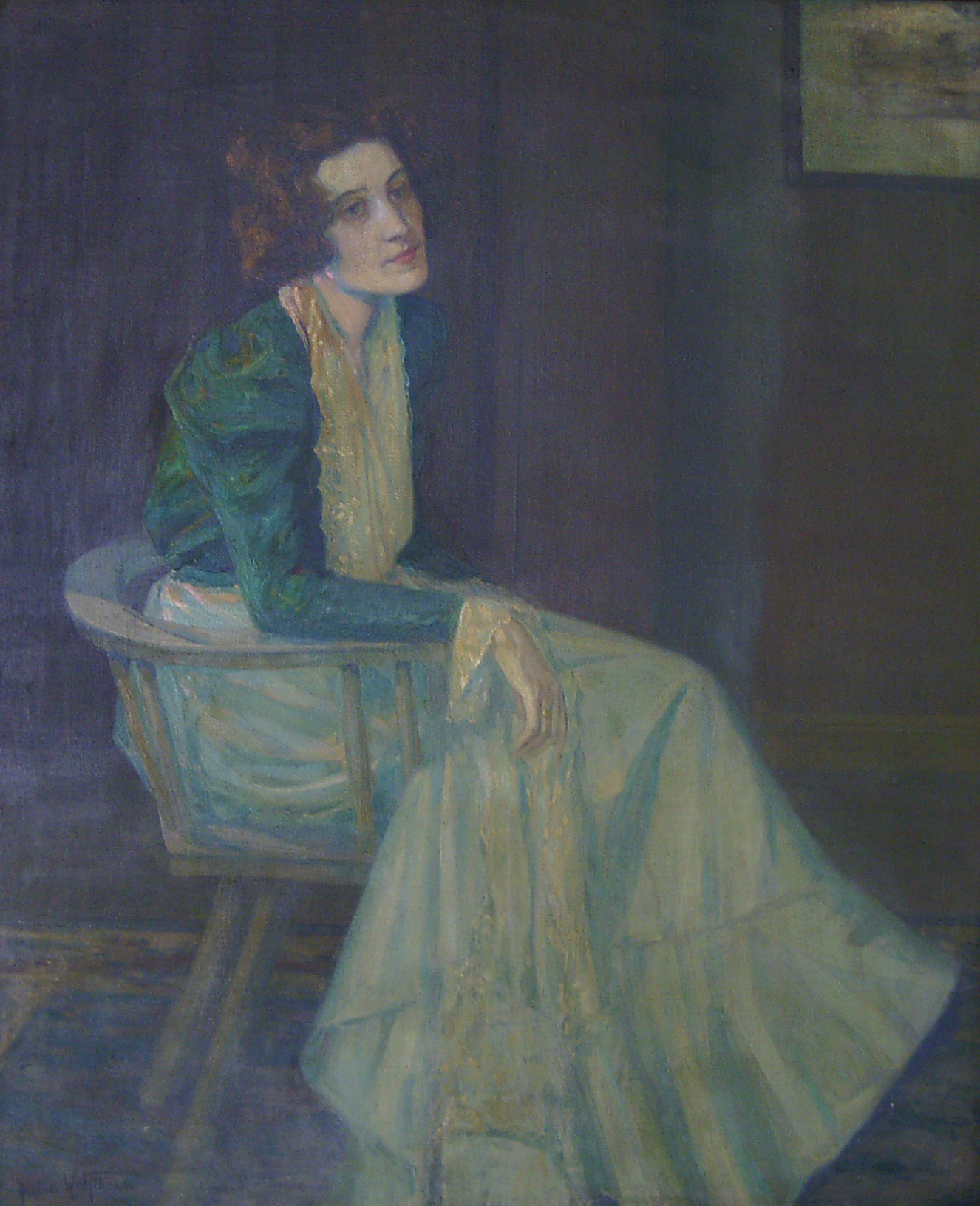
Portrait of Hedda Eulenberg (1901)

Wolfthorn was born in Thorn (Toruń) in the Prussian Province of Prussia. In 1883, she moved to Berlin to live with her relatives after her parents died. In 1890, she studied in Curt Herrmann's Drawing and Painting School for ladies. Since German art academies would not permit women, she traveled to Paris to study at the Académie Colarossi and Académie Julian, where she gained much of the skills needed to become successful. After she finished her studies in Paris, Wolfthorn returned to Berlin. In 1898, she became the co-founder of the Berlin Secession and the "Verein der Künstlerinnen und Kunstfreunde Berlin" (Association of Artists and Art Lovers Berlin). In 1905, Julie Wolfthorn and over 200 female artists signed a petition to be allowed to join the Prussian Academy of Arts, which was ultimately rejected by the academy director Anton von Werner.

With Käthe Kollwitz, she founded the exhibition cooperation "Verbindung Bildender Künstlerinnen". The two women are elected to directors of the "Secession" in 1912, but she and Fanny Remak are removed in 1933. Julie Wolfthorn stayed in Berlin, working with the "Kulturbund Deutscher Juden" (Cultural Association of German Jews) under pressure from the Nazis, which declared it illegal in 1941, arresting the members and seizing the possessions.

On 28 October 1942, 78-year-old Julie Wolfthorn and her sister Luise Wolf who, like all other family members except the painter called themselves Wolff or Wolf, were transported to the Theresienstadt concentration camp. Wolfthorn is said to have continued drawing, as far as possible under the circumstances, until her death on 26 December 1944.

== Work ==
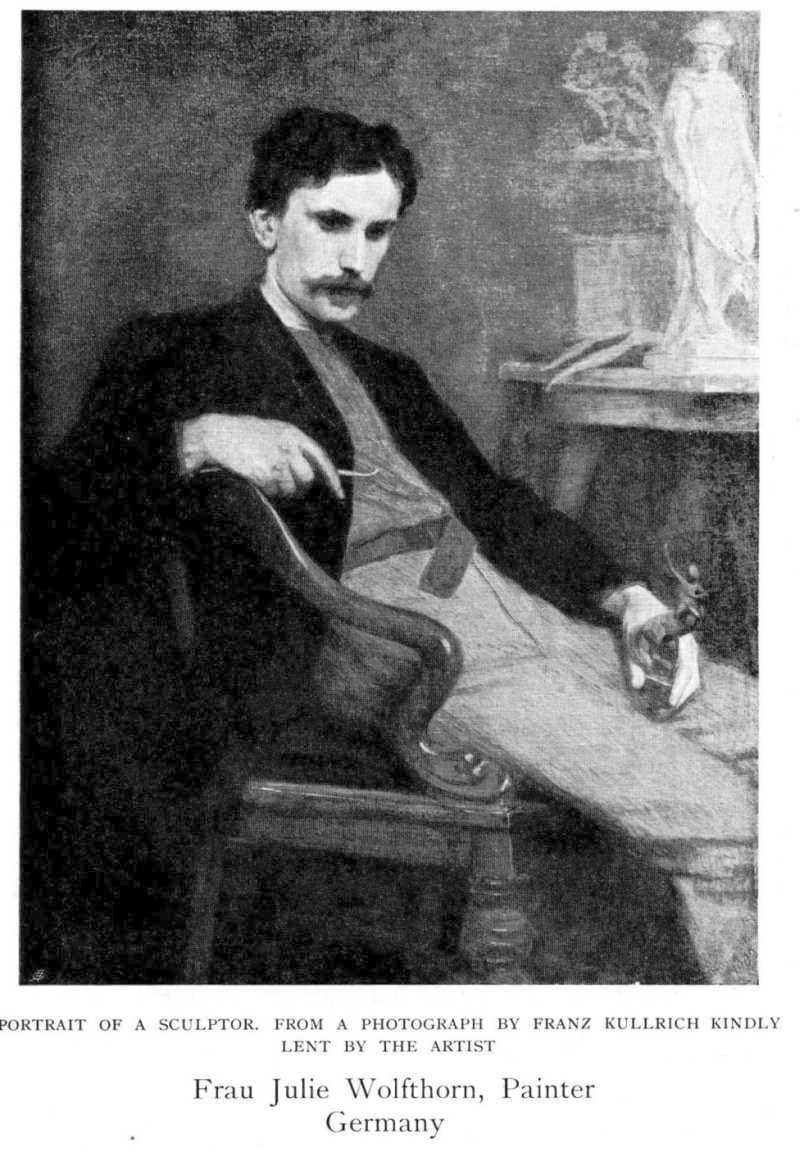
Portrait of German sculptor Georg Wolf (1905)

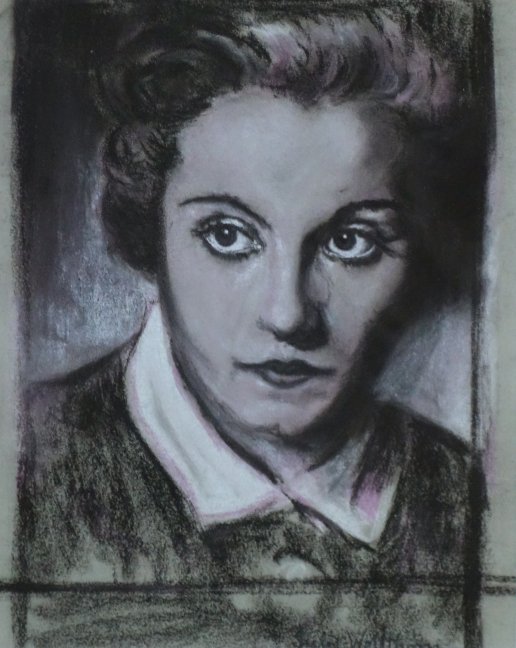
Portrait of Marlene Dietrich, c. 1930

Known best for her portraits, Wolfthorn was one of the leading female artists at the start of the 20th century, along with Käthe Kollwitz and Dora Hitz. She created portraits of hundreds of famous people from her time from Berlin, including many female activists. Some of the most famous subjects of her portraits include:

- Ida and Richard Dehmel
- Marlene Dietrich
- Hedda Eulenberg
- Hedwig Lachmann
- Gustav Landauer
- the families of the architects Hermann Muthesius and Peter Behrens
- Dagny Juel-Przybyszewska
- Gabriele Reuter
- Grete and Conrad Ansorge
- Tilla Durieux
- Maria Orska
- Carola Neher
- Bjørn Bjørnson
- Margarethe and Gerhart Hauptmann
- Emilie and Rudolf Mosse
- Christian Rohlfs

== Literature ==
- Breuer, Gerda. Meer, Julia (Ed.): Women in Graphic Design, Jovis. Berlin, 2012. ISBN 978-3-86859-153-8, p. 403 ff, 587-588
- Heike Carstensen: Leben und Werk der Malerin und Graphikerin Julie Wolfthorn (1864 – 1944) : Rekonstruktion eines Künstlerinnenlebens, Marburg 2011.
- Hedwig Brenner: Jüdische Frauen in der bildenden Kunst II. Konstanz 2004.
- Jugend Jg. 2, No. 47, cover design, 1897.
