= Ottilie Reylaender =

German painter (1882–1965)

Ottilie Reylaender (19 October 1882 – 29 March 1965) was a German painter. She was one of the pioneers of modern art in Germany.

== Life and work ==
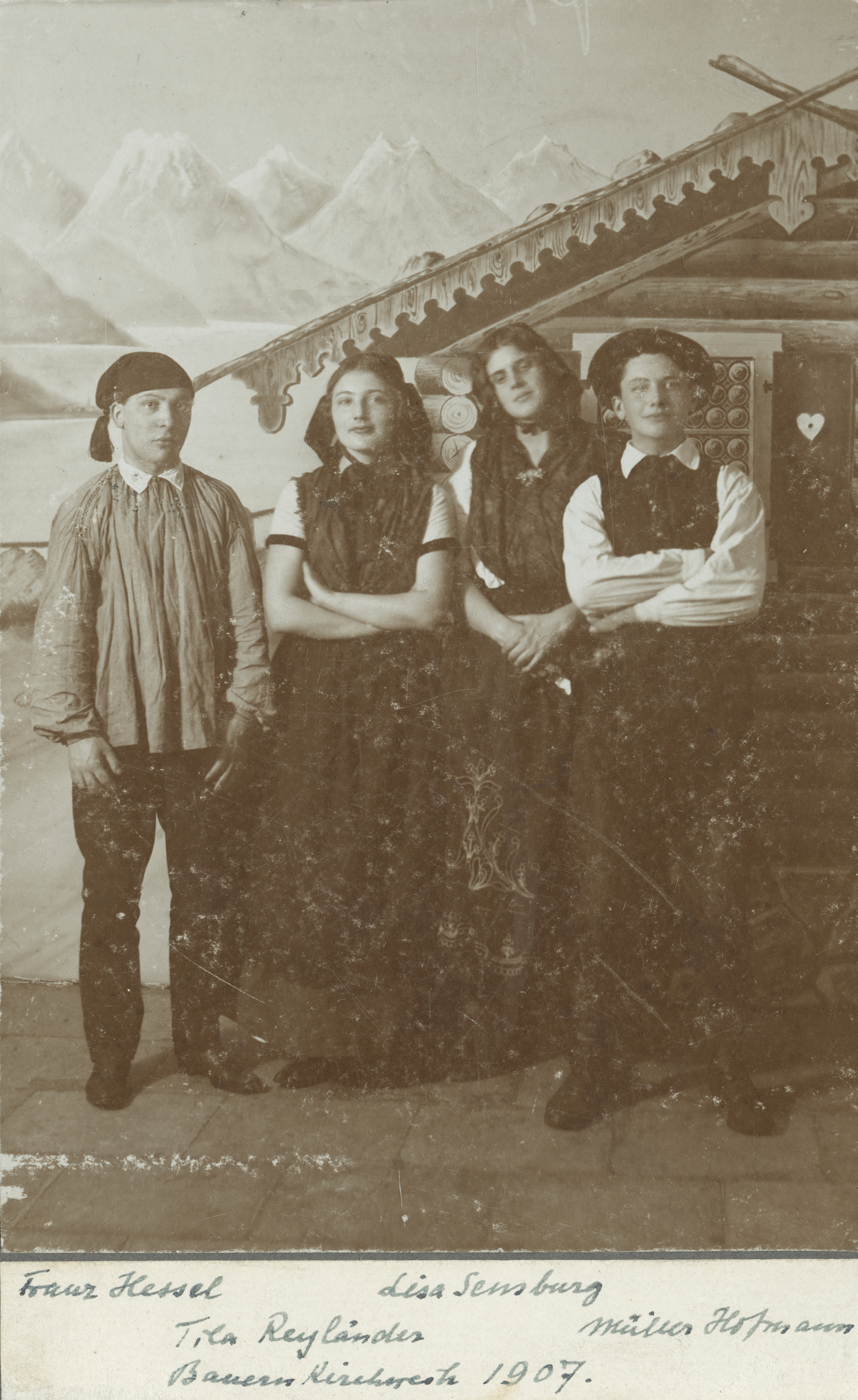
Franz Hessel, Ottilie Reylaender, Lisa Sensburg, and Wilhelm Müller-Hofmann at a Munich artists festival (Bauernkirchweih) in 1907

Ottilie Reylaender was born in Wesselburen in 1882, the daughter of a large family of civil servants. She showed a talent for drawing and, after graduating from school, she moved in 1898 to Worpswede where she became a student of Fritz Mackensen, painter and co-founder of the Worpswede artists' colony, and became friends with her classmates Paula Becker and Clara Westhoff. In 1900 she travelled to Paris, where she stayed in the studio of Paula Becker, who was not in the city at the time. In Paris, Reylaender attended the private art schools Académie Julian and Académie Colarossi, since women were not admitted to the state German art schools until 1918. In 1905 she went on a trip to Italy with the sculptors Hedwig Woermann and Dora Herxheimer and met the Polish glass painter Bohdan von Suchocki in Munich, who later became her partner for a long time after he had separated from Franziska zu Reventlow.

In 1908 she spent most of her time in Rome and in May was able to move into a studio at Villa Strohl-Fern, where she received support from Hermann Haller and Paul Osswald. Osswald established contact with the art dealer and collector Alfred Flechtheim, who managed to sell her paintings and later included them in his gallery's programme. In 1908 Reylaender also became friends with the poet Rainer Maria Rilke, from which an exchange of letters developed until 1921. In 1910 she went to Mexico with Bohdan von Suchocki and later took care of his son Bodzito. In 1925 she met Diego Rivera and Tina Modotti. After 17 years abroad, Reylaender returned to Germany in 1927. The following year she met Clara Westhoff again and attended Arthur Segal's painting school.

In 1929 she married the teacher Traugott Böhme; the couple's permanent residence was Berlin. After the Second World War, together with Oda Hardt-Rösler, she founded the private painting school Das Atelier im Freien. Böhme died in 1954; Ottilie Reylaender-Böhme died in 1965 in Berlin and was buried next to him.

In addition to her early portraits of girls and peasants, which were influenced by Paula Modersohn-Becker, Ottilie Reylaender painted numerous landscapes of her homeland and later of the countries she travelled to. In Mexico she created portraits of indigenous Mexicans.

In 2013, her work was exhibited in the Worpswede Art Gallery with other so-called "Malweiber" female artists with the title Female painters on the move: women conquered art around 1900.

== Exhibitions ==
- 1912: Sonderbund Exhibition, Cologne
- 1924: Galerie Flechtheim, Berlin and Worpsweder Kunstschau H. Seekamp
- 1928: Kunstverein in Hamburg
- 1929: Haus Paula Becker and Verein der Berliner Künstlerinnen
- 1942: 75 Jahre Verein der Berliner Künstlerinnen
- 1943: Kunstverein Hannover. All paintings destroyed in a bombing raid
- 1949: Archivarion, Berlin
- 1957: Delphi-Haus, Berlin
- 1959: Berliner Kunstkabinett
- 1996/97: Garten der Frauen, group exhibition at the Sprengel Museum, Hannover, afterwards at the Von der Heydt-Museum, Wuppertal. It showed works by seven female artists classified as “pioneers of modernism in Germany”: Erma Bossi, Käte Lassen, Paula Modersohn-Becker, Gabriele Münter, Ottilie Reylaender, Clara Rilke-Westhoff, Marianne von Werefkin
- 2013: Group exhibition Malerinnen im Aufbruch, de:Worpsweder Kunsthalle
- 2015: KunstWege – LebensZeichen, Worpsweder Kunsthalle
- 2015/16: Ottilie Reylaender. Worpswede – Mexiko, Kunstkaten Ahrenshoop

== Sources ==
- Nina Lübbren: Ottilie Reylaender. Eine Malerin in Worpswede um die Jahrhundertwende. Magisterarbeit, Kunsthistorisches Institut, Freie Universität Berlin, 1990 (in German)
- Brigitte Doppagne: Ottilie Reylaender: Stationen einer Malerin. Worpsweder Verlag, Worpswede 1994, ISBN 3-89299-170-7 (in German)
- Ulrich Krempel, Susanne Meyer-Büser (ed): Garten der Frauen. Wegbereiterinnen der Moderne in Deutschland. 1900–1914. Ars Nicolai, Berlin 1996, ISBN 3-87584-994-9 (in German)
- Christoph Otterbeck: Europa verlassen. Künstlerreisen am Beginn des 20. Jahrhunderts. pp 196–206, Böhlau, Köln 2007, ISBN 978-3-412-00206-0, (view online) (in German)
- Bernd Stenzig (ed.): Rainer Maria Rilke: Die Briefe an Ottilie Reylaender 1908–1921. In: Blätter der Rilke-Gesellschaft. Bd. 27/28. Frankfurt am Main u. Leipzig 2007. pp 187–232 (in German)
- Heiner Egge: Tilas Farben: Ein Roman über Ottilie Reylaender. Atelier im Bauernhaus, Fischerhude 2013, ISBN 978-3-88132-380-2 (in German)
