= Seventh German Inner Africa Research Expedition =

German espionage mission to Ethiopia, 1915

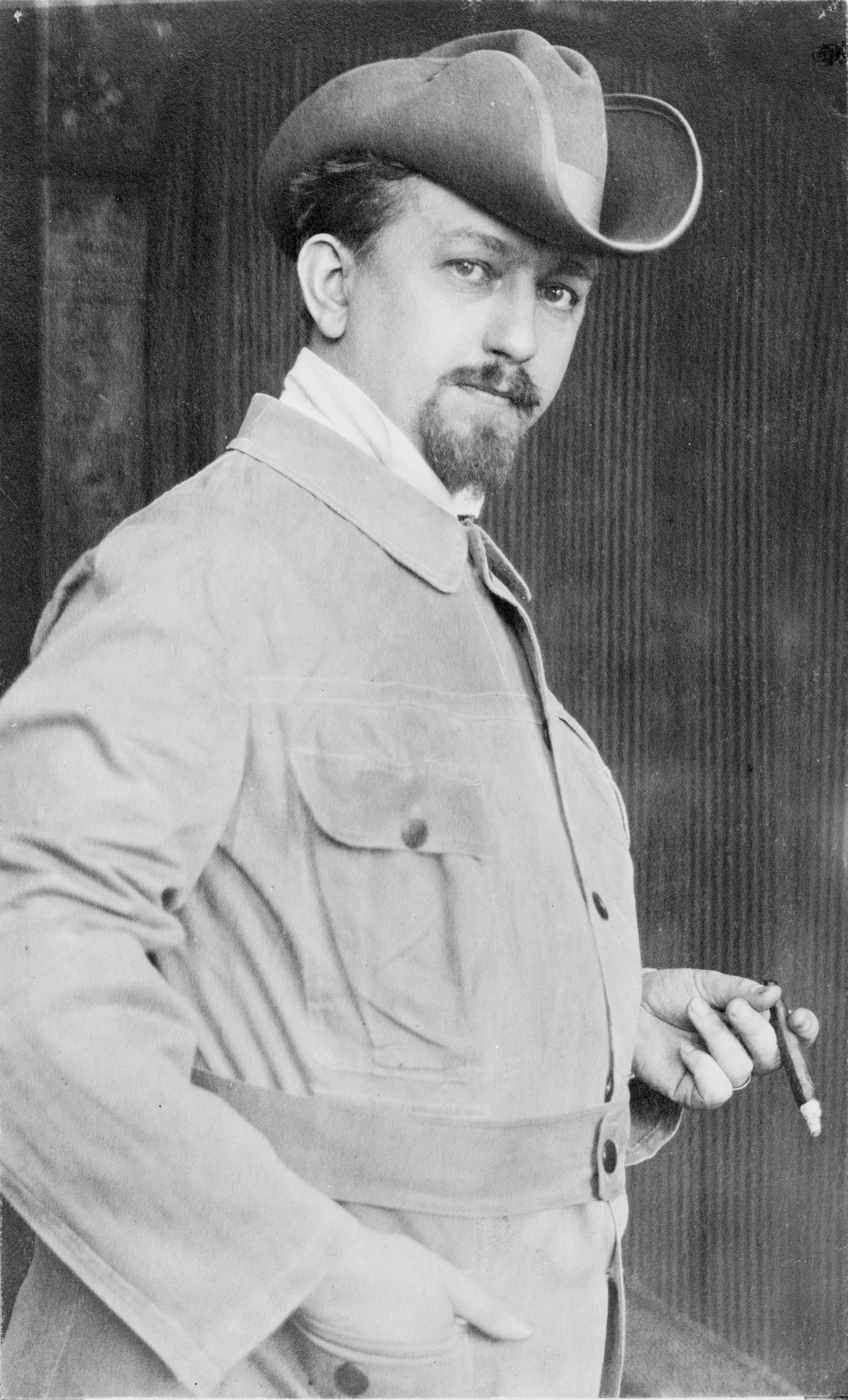
Leo Frobenius

The Seventh German Inner Africa Research Expedition (codenamed HIDDEK) was led by German ethnologist and archaeologist Leo Frobenius from October 1914 to March 1915. Though referred to as the seventh of Frobenius' scientific expeditions to Africa it was a front for a German military espionage mission to Ethiopia. The objective was to restore communications with the German legation at Addis Ababa; persuade Ethiopian Emperor Lij Iyasu to support the Central Powers in the First World War and to proceed to Anglo-Egyptian Sudan to provoke an uprising there. This could have threatened British and Italian colonies in Eastern Africa and possibly the vital supply route of the Suez Canal.

The expedition is thought to have comprised seventeen persons, five of European descent and twelve of Turkish or Arab origin. The European contingent left Berlin in October 1914 and later met with the other members in the Ottoman Empire (a German ally). After travelling by rail, cart, camel and dhow to Al Qunfudhah in Saudi Arabia, the party boarded a sambuk for the Red Sea crossing to Eritrea. Despite travelling incognito, the party is thought to have been identified by British agents and was intercepted by four British and French vessels but allowed on its way. The Italian authorities became aware of the expedition and it was abandoned, with the expedition being granted safe passage from Eritrea on 26 March 1915.

Despite not having entered Ethiopia, Frobenius heralded the expedition as a success and campaigned for the right to lead a follow-up expedition. The second expedition was instead led by Friedrich Salomon Hall in June 1915 and led to an agreement with Iyasu. The Ethiopian government lent their support to rebels in Entente Somaliland and burnt down several Italian radio stations, but was ousted in a British-supported coup in 1916. Frobenius continued his scientific expeditions to Africa after the war, but found it difficult to gain entry to British-controlled territories due to his involvement in this operation.

== Background ==
Leo Frobenius was a self-taught German ethnologist and archaeologist who specialised in African cultures. He led twelve German Inner Africa Research Expeditions (Deutsche Innerafrikanische Forschungs-Expeditions, DIAFE) to Africa between 1904 and 1935. His work in the field is of considerable documentary value but his conclusions on the development of African civilisation from non-African origins were controversial and are not supported by modern writers. He has also been accused of using the expeditions to loot items of cultural value from Africa. At the outbreak of the First World War in 1914, Frobenius was regarded as the foremost German expert on Africa. He had close contacts with Kaiser Wilhelm II and often corresponded with him.

== Strategic aims ==
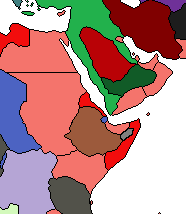
Territories in the Middle East and Africa at the start of the First World War. The Ottoman Empire is in light green, British Empire in pink, German East Africa is the dark grey territory at the bottom of the image. Ethiopia is in brown towards the centre of the image and Italian Eritrea is the red territory immediately north.

Oberste Heeresleitung, the German high command, were keen to secure the entry of Ethiopia into the war on the side of the Central Powers. Anglo-Egyptian Sudan, the East Africa Protectorate, British Somaliland and French Somaliland were all possessions of the Entente Powers, and the Germans hoped that an Ethiopian declaration of war would lead to territorial losses or the withdrawal of Entente units fighting the Germans on the Western Front. Germany was also suspicious of the loyalty of the Italians, nominally members of the Central Powers, but not yet participants in the war. If the Italians had joined the Entente Powers, Ethiopian forces would have been ideally positioned to occupy Italian Eritrea and Italian Somaliland.

The Germans were hopeful that Ethiopian Emperor Lij Iyasu could be persuaded to ally with Mohammed Abdullah Hassan, a nationalist and religious leader who had fought the colonial authorities in the Somalilands since 1899. The Germans also had plans to instigate an uprising in Sudan which might threaten the Suez Canal and inspire a wider jihad against the British.

The German government was unable to communicate directly with Friedrich Wilhelm von Syburg, their envoy at the German legation in Ethiopia, and messages had to be passed in cipher via disguised couriers on a route through the Ottoman Empire, the Red Sea and Italian Eritrea. The Germans planned an expedition to Ethiopia which would restore communications and advance their objectives for Ethiopia and Sudan. It was decided that this expedition would publicly be called scientific to disguise its military and political aims. Frobenius offered his services as leader of the expedition to the Kaiser on 13 November 1914, who directed that the expedition should proceed. The expedition formed the seventh of Frobenius' Deutsche Innerafrikanische Forschungs-Expeditions (German Inner-Africa Research Expeditions), though some sources incorrectly refer to it as his fourth expedition. In German intelligence circles it was codenamed HIDDEK, an acronym for Die Hauptsache ist, daß England untergeht (The main thing is that England is destroyed).

== Planning ==
Frobenius had visited Sudan during his 1912 expedition, but had no experience in Eritrea or Ethiopia and spoke none of the local languages. His plan was to carry mail to the legation, meet with Ethiopian politicians to secure their support for the German cause, proceed to Sudan to persuade the population to rise up and to strengthen links between the Ottoman Empire and the Muslim inhabitants of Sudan, Danakil, Somalia, Libya and Ethiopia. The expedition was fairly inexpensive, owing to the use of equipment from Frobenius' previous expeditions and had funding of 60,000 German marks in a mixture of hard currencies including marks, Ottoman piastres, Austro-Hungarian Maria Theresa thaler and Italian lira. The German government also provided a quantity of weapons and ammunition. The Ottoman Empire was invited to join the expedition and accepted, hoping to counter British presence in Egypt. In advance of the expedition the Ottomans made diplomatic concessions to Ethiopia by returning ownership of a number of monastic properties in Jerusalem.

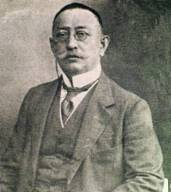
Bekir Sami Kunduh

The members of the expedition are disputed, but are thought to have numbered around seventeen: five Europeans and twelve Turks or Arabs. The European members were Frobenius, ethnographer Albrecht Martius, photographer Robert Türstig, foreign office official Hieronymus Kistenfeger and interpreter Mario Passarge. Amongst the other members was Bekir Sami Kunduh, the former governor of Libya and a future Turkish foreign minister and Friedrich Salomon Hall, a German citizen of Ethiopian origin. Hall's task was to lead the negotiations with the Ethiopian government.

Frobenius is known to have valued honorary titles, and before setting out on the expedition insisted that he was granted various honours. He was awarded the title of geheimrat (privy councillor), German resident at Darfur and Ottoman plenipotentiary in Arabia. He was also appointed the title of pasha of the Ottoman Empire, which he appended to his Arabic name "Abdul Kerim".

== Journey to Africa ==
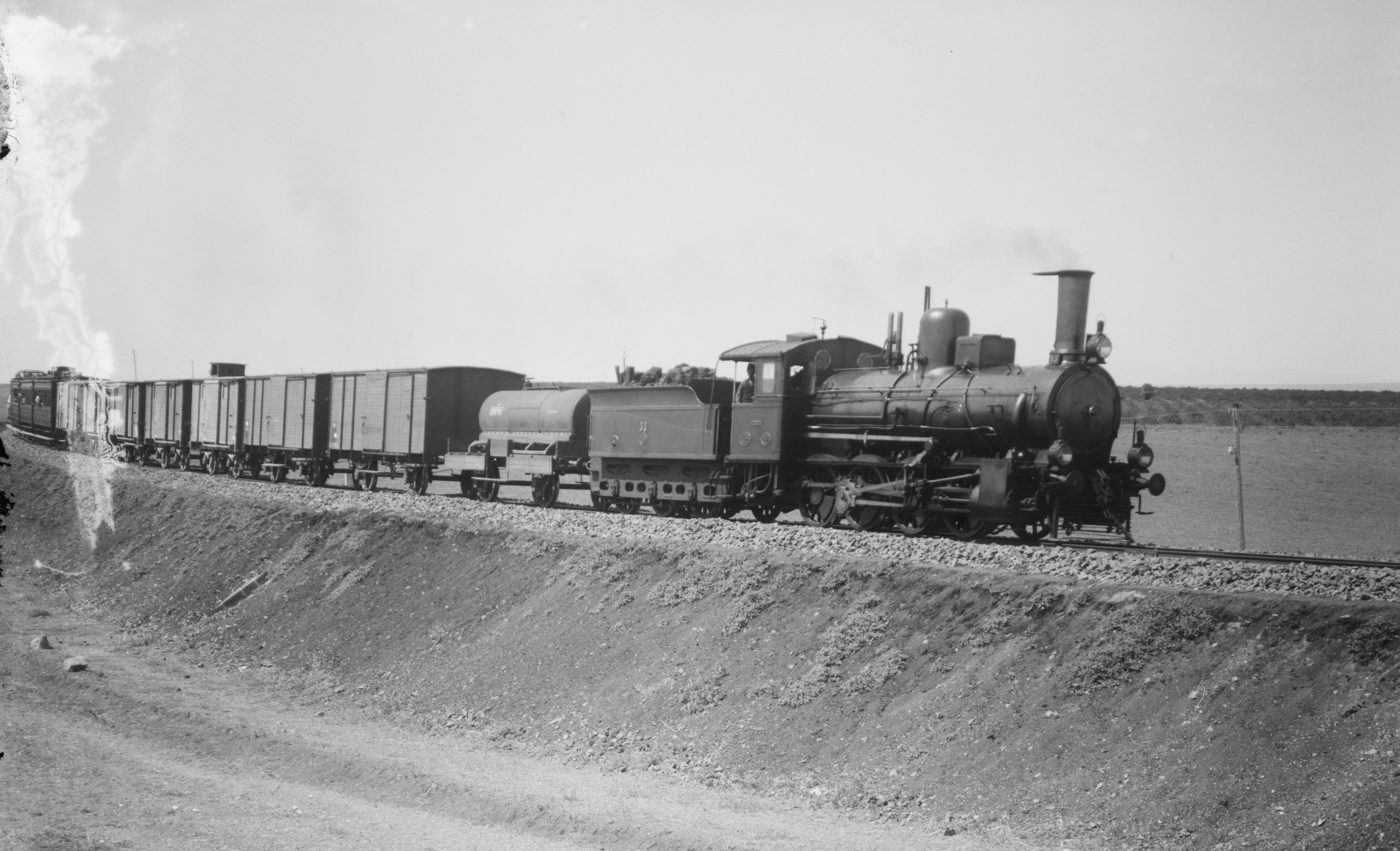
Berlin-Baghdad Railway train

The expedition left Berlin in early October 1914 and travelled via Austria, Romania and Bulgaria to reach Constantinople, capital of the Ottoman Empire, on 21 November. They left the city on 24 December and travelled via the Chemins de fer Ottomans d'Anatolie, the Berlin–Baghdad railway, horse-drawn cart and camel via Aleppo to Damascus, Syria which they reached on 5 January. The party resided at the Hotel Victoria whilst the full complement of European staff was gathered.

The expedition travelled from Damascus via the Hejaz railway to Jaffa in Palestine, where many of the Ottoman contingent were recruited. The party continued by rail to Al-`Ula in north-western Arabia, arriving on 15 January 1915. They travelled south by Bedouin camel to Al Wajh on the coast of the Red Sea. Frobenius made careful assessments of the political condition of the regions he travelled through and reported to Berlin of the weakness of Ottoman forces in the area, the unpopularity of their Tripoli-born officials and the poverty and hunger caused by the British blockade and disruption of the Hajj pilgrimage. He also noted the success that the British were having in buying the loyalty of the Arab population with food shipments.

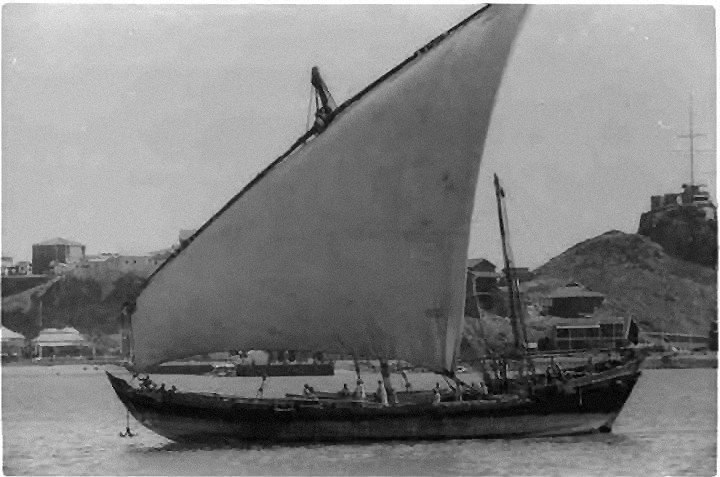
A Red Sea sambuk

The expedition left Al Wajh on 24 January and proceeded via dhow to Al Qunfudhah, arriving on 7 February. Here many of the expedition disguised themselves in Arab robes and posed as smugglers of animal hides; the Palestinian Arabs in the party were disguised as gardeners. Türstig masqueraded as an official of the Red Cross and his eighty packs of photographic equipment were disguised as hospital supplies. On 13 February the expedition boarded a sambuk to make the crossing of the Red Sea to Africa.

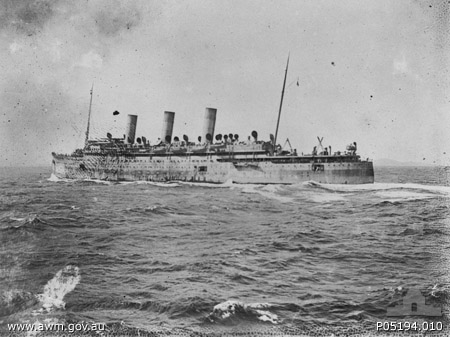
The Empress of Russia in the Red Sea

The sambuk was intercepted on its first day of travel by the armed merchant cruiser Empress of Russia at the Farasan Islands; because of which Frobenius suspected that his movements in Arabia had been monitored by British agents. The vessel was allowed to proceed on its way until later that day when she was again brought to inspection by the French cruiser Desaix. The crew of the sambuk distracted the French sailors by trying to sell postcards to them whilst Frobenius' men used a toilet to enter the boat's sanitary tank. The expedition escaped detection and even managed to take a photograph of the Desaix through a crack in the sambuk's hull. The sambuk was stopped and inspected twice more by British vessels near Al Hudaydah and was again allowed to proceed on her journey.

The sambuk docked at Massawa in Italian Eritrea on 15 February 1915. British intelligence services had tipped off the Italians about the expedition as early as February 1915 and the party received a cold reception from the Italian authorities. Suspicions were later raised that Passarge, Frobenius' interpreter, who held dual Italian and German citizenship and was a close friend of Carmine Senise (a prominent Italian intelligence official), may have been a double agent. Frobenius also compromised the expedition by introducing himself in Massawa as a military captain.

== Discovery ==
At Massawa the expedition members took part in hunting, other social activities and made visits to Zazega (near Asmara), Maji Malehesh, Lamdrara and Dembe Wadi Mudui to view rock engravings, of which 37 sketches were made. Compared to his previous expeditions, scientific output was much less, rather than thousands of photographs, the seventh expedition took fewer than one hundred.

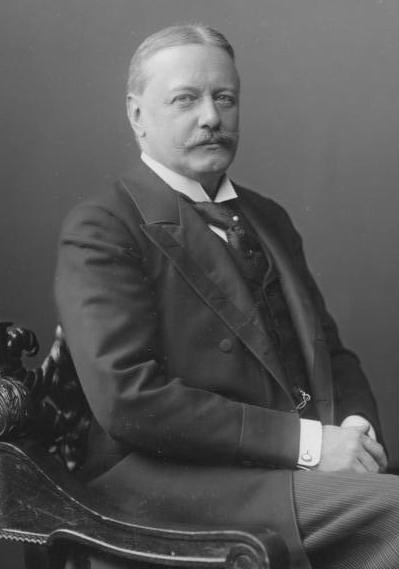
Von Bülow

Some of the expedition members took rooms on board the Hamburg America Line vessel Christian X. The Italian chief of civil affairs in the town had the vessel monitored and was disturbed to find that Frobenius had bought an Italian flag (for use as a false flag), had purchased maps of the coastline and was making trips to identify potential landing sites. Frobenius also made contact with Bernhard von Bülow of the Foreign Office in Berlin to obtain diplomatic bags to carry mail to the German Legation in Addis Ababa.

The presence of Frobenius in Eritrea was a threat to Italian neutrality but expelling him would also jeopardise it. The discovery of pro-jihadi leaflets in Frobenius' possession provided a convenient pretext. News of the leaflets was passed to the Italian parliament and soon after it was made public, Bülow made an appeal to the Italians to grant Frobenius safe passage to Germany. Lengthy negotiations between the British, French and Italian governments eventually resulted in an agreement, with the British foreign secretary Edward Grey happy to provide safe conduct to Frobenius in recognition of the work done to thwart his mission by the Italians. The expedition left Massawa on 26 March, the European members were given passage aboard the postal vessel Adalia for Port Said (in British Egypt) and the Arab and Turkish members boarded the Italian ship Montenegro for Jaffa and onward travel to Jerusalem where they arrived on 6 April.

== Aftermath ==
From Port Said the European members of the party travelled on to Naples, Italy where they arrived in April 1915. Türstig accompanied the expedition's equipment and the remaining ℳ 2,250.50 back to Germany via Genoa whilst the rest of the members travelled to Rome to meet with Bülow. The German consul in Naples tried to downplay the affair, claiming that Frobenius had acted only as a messenger to the legation in Addis Ababa, and Frobenius took part in several interviews with La Tribuna and press agencies to deny espionage and to play down the military background of his party. He later admitted his aim had been "to influence the Arab countries on behalf of the Ottoman government", admitted to military espionage and campaigned to be awarded a medal from the Italian authorities. Frobenius' indiscretion caused the German embassy some difficulties and he was sent back to Germany on 9 April, crossing the Austrian border shortly before Italy declared its intention to enter the war on the Allied side. Frobenius' lack of secrecy throughout the expedition has been named as a contributing factor to its failure. The failure of the expedition caused friction between the Germans and the Ottomans and the German ambassador to the Sublime Porte reported that "the Turkish government has become extremely sensitive by our various expeditions, especially that of Frobenius [which] has earned the biggest mistrust".

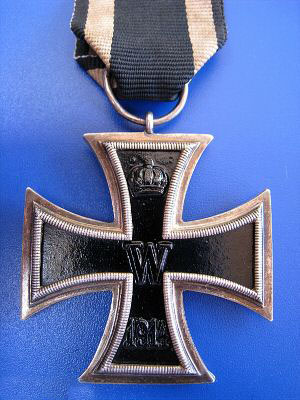
Iron Cross 2nd Class

In Berlin Frobenius presented the mission as a success, claiming to have made important contacts in the area and was awarded the Iron Cross 2nd Class. The failure seems to have caused no harm to his political or scientific standing in Germany. Frobenius proposed that he be dispatched immediately to lead a second expedition with the same aims. This request was denied and he was instead appointed to command a prisoner of war camp housing captured African and Indian soldiers. Frobenius spent the rest of the war consolidating his research from previous expeditions and cataloguing artefacts from his collection. His scientific output from the seventh expedition was lower than his previous expeditions. Fewer than 100 photographs were taken in Eritrea and only one paper, a study of local architecture published. His other expeditions had produced thousands of photographs and provided the basis for more than fifty books.

A follow-up expedition was sent in June 1915 under command of Salomon Hall but he was captured by the Italian police whilst in disguise as a local. Hall managed to get documents passed to the German legation, which promised the Ethiopians a port on the Red Sea and any territory captured from the Allies in return for their cooperation. Emperor Iyasu sent weapons to Hassan and destroyed Italian radio stations but was deposed in 1916 after his excommunication by the Ethiopian Orthodox Church, which feared he had converted to Islam. The overthrow of Iyasu is thought to have been encouraged by the Allies and brought Ras Tafari Makonnen (later known as Emperor Haile Selassie) to power.

Frobenius founded the Institute for the Morphology of Culture (later the Frobenius Institute) in Frankfurt in 1920 and became professor of ethnology at University of Frankfurt. He was keen to continue his expeditions into Africa after the war but found travel was more difficult now he was known to the British intelligence services. Frobenius' expedition to Sudan in 1926 was affected by a British refusal to grant him access to Khartoum and a proposed expedition to Rhodesia in 1927 had to be cancelled after he was blacklisted from travelling to the British colony. The final expedition he led to Africa (Libya 1933) was closely monitored by Italian authorities. Frobenius looked further afield and led expeditions to New Guinea and Australia in 1937–38, before his death in August 1938.

== Bibliography ==
- Bickel, Beatrice (October 1923). "Leo Frobenius, Das Unbekannte Afrika (Unknown Africa)". The Journal of Negro History. 8 (4): 455–458. doi:10.2307/2713696. ISSN 0022-2992. JSTOR 2713696.
- Da Riva, Rocío; Biocca, Dario (5 August 2016). "Leo Frobenius' Secret Mission in Arabia and Eritrea (1914–1915)". Arabian Humanities. Revue internationale d'archéologie et de sciences sociales sur la péninsule Arabique/International Journal of Archaeology and Social Sciences in the Arabian Peninsula (in French) (6). doi:10.4000/cy.3099. ISSN 1248-0568. Archived from the original on 18 June 2019.
- Haller, Dieter (2012). Die Suche nach dem Fremden: Geschichte der Ethnologie in der Bundesrepublik 1945–1990 (in German). Campus Verlag. ISBN 978-3-593-39600-2.
- Kuba, Richard (2018). "Portraits of Distant Worlds. Frobenius' Pictorial Archive and its Legacy". In Sissy Helff; Stefanie Michels (eds.). Global Photographies: Memory - History - Archives. transcript. pp. 109–131. doi:10.25969/mediarep/1652. ISBN 9783839430064.
- Magill, Frank M., ed. (13 May 2011). The 20th Century A-GI: Dictionary of World Biography. Vol. VII. Abingdon, Oxfordshire: Routledge. ISBN 978-1-57958-046-9.
- Schmidt, Wolbert; Thubauville, Sophia (2015). Cultural Research in Northeast Africa: German Histories and Stories. Frankfurt: Frobenius-Institut. pp. 173–183.
- Shinn, David H.; Ofcansky, Thomas P. (2013). Historical Dictionary of Ethiopia. Scarecrow Press. p. 424. ISBN 978-0-8108-7457-2.
- Westphal-Hellbusch, Sigrid (October 1959). "The Present Situation of Ethnological Research in Germany". American Anthropologist. 61 (5): 848–865. doi:10.1525/aa.1959.61.5.02a00110. ISSN 0002-7294. S2CID 204465880.
- Wintjes, Justine (November 2013). "The Frobenius expedition to Natal and the Cinyati archive". Southern African Humanities: 167–205.
