= Friedrich Rosen =

German Orientalist, diplomat and politician

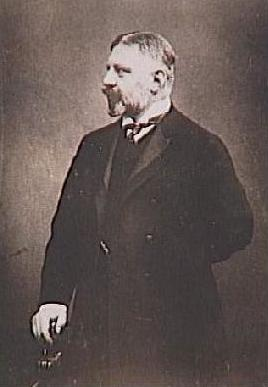
Friedrich Rosen, 1910

Friedrich Rosen or Fritz Rosen (Leipzig, August 30, 1856 – November 27, 1935, Beijing) was a German Orientalist, diplomat and politician. From May to October 1921 he was the Foreign Minister of Germany.

== Background ==
Friedrich Rosen's grandfather, Friedrich Ballhorn-Rosen, was Chancellor of the Principality of Lippe; his father, Georg Rosen, an orientalist, published writings on Islam. However, Georg Rosen decided to enter the diplomatic service of Prussia. He was active as a consul in the Middle East and the Balkans. Friedrich's mother Serena Anna, daughter of Ignaz Moscheles, came from a British scholarly family of Jewish faith (who had converted to Christianity).

== Early years ==
In this cosmopolitan atmosphere, Friedrich Rosen was born in 1856 in Leipzig. However, he grew up in Jerusalem, where his father was consul. Friedrich Rosen enjoyed an education in four languages (German, English, Arabic and Turkish). He early decided to study modern and oriental languages, which brought him to Berlin, Leipzig, Göttingen, and Paris. After graduating, he worked for several months in London as a tutor for the children of Frederick Temple Hamilton-Temple-Blackwood, the viceroy of India.

He retained a basically anglophilic attitude and a passion for oriental culture all his life. From 1887 onwards, he taught Persian and Urdu at the Department of Oriental Languages of the Friedrich-Wilhelms-Universität in Berlin.

== Diplomatic career ==
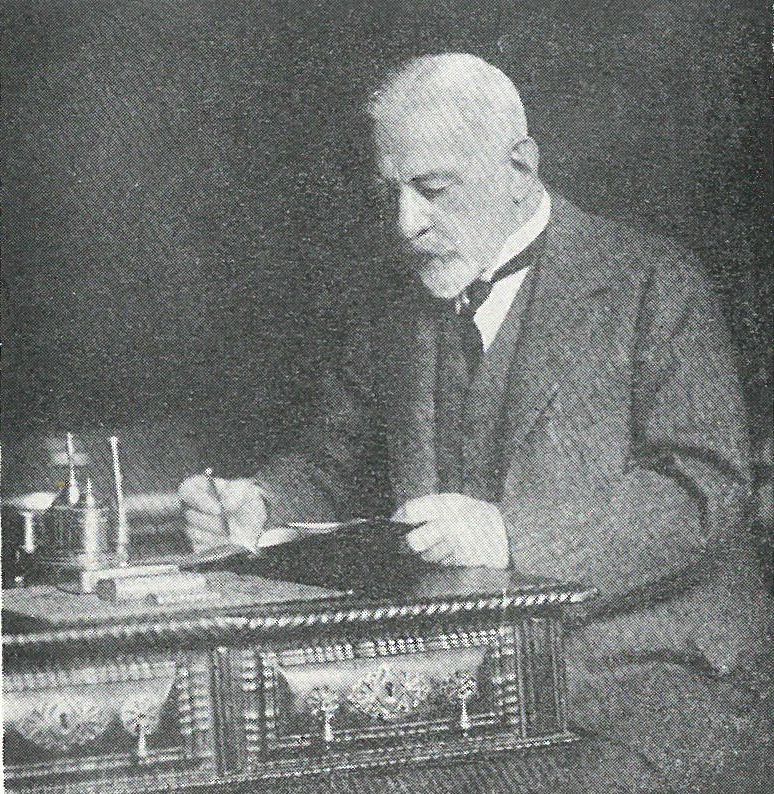
Rosen in his office, 1930.

After a dispute with the university department leadership in 1890, he gave up his academic position, and as his father before him he entered a career at the Foreign Office. He was employed as a representative in Beirut and Tehran, until 1898 when he was placed in charge of establishing a consulate in Baghdad.

The diplomatic work in the Middle East was compatible with Rosen's orientalist interests. He was conversant in Arabic and Persian, and obtained an intimate knowledge of Persian culture. In 1890, he published Modern Persian Grammar, with Nāsir al-Din Shāh, the Shah of Iran, as co-author; parts of the diary of the latter were employed as texts. In 1899, he accompanied the archeologist Gertrude Bell on her visit to Jerusalem.

After his travel to Palestine, Kaiser Wilhelm II appointed Rosen as consul in Jerusalem. Only two years later in 1900, he was appointed to the Political Department of Foreign Affairs. Rosen was considered as an expert on the Arab world. Moreover, like his friend Wilhelm Solf, he held liberal views, and simultaneously supported the monarchy and was an anglophile, and thus was considered as the right person for achieving an understanding with Britain.

From 1904 to 1905, Friedrich Rosen represented the interests of the German Empire in Ethiopia, in what after him was called the Rosengesandtschaft ("the Rosen Embassy"). Ethiopia hardly had as good relations with any other major power as with Germany. Returning to Europe, Rosen was appointed envoy in Tangiers. From 1910 to 1912, Rosen was envoy in Bucharest, and from 1912 to 1916 in Lisbon. In 1916, after Germany declared war on Portugal, Rosen returned home.

Wilhelm II then appointed him as envoy at The Hague. As a representative of the German government, he helped prepare and visited Wilhelm at Huis Doorn, after the former kaiser went into exile, a visit which the German public noted with mixed feelings.

== Foreign minister ==
In the spring of 1921 the German chancellor, Joseph Wirth, appointed Rosen foreign minister. On the issue of war reparations, the Centre Party's Wirth considered an anglophilic and also independent foreign minister to be advantageous.

Rosen retired in protest against the London ultimatum, in which the Allied powers combined demands of high reparations from Germany with threats of sanctions. He considered the policy of the victorious powers hypocritical: on the one hand proclaiming self-determination of all nations, but on the other hand showing no respect to the referendum in Upper Silesia, where a 60-percent majority had voted in favour of remaining Germany.

Thus, Friedrich Rosen retired in October 1921 from the civil service. Following the same policy, Wirth named Walther Rathenau as his successor, who was committed to the same principles.

== Orientalist again ==
Rosen became chairman of the German Oriental Society, the umbrella organization of the Orientalists in Germany, and dedicated himself increasingly to scientific work. In this field, his today still well-known translation of the Rubaiyat of Omar Khayyam has been published in several editions.

Since the seizure of power by the Nazis, whose ideology Friedrich Rosen opposed from the beginning, the former Foreign Minister was subjected to anti-Semitic hatred, because of his descent. Hence until his death he maintained contact with the SeSiSo Club of his friend Wilhelm Solf, from which a few years later the resistance group Solf Circle developed.

As the result of a fracture, Friedrich Rosen died in 1935 during a stay in Beijing, where his son Dr. Georg Rosen was working at the German embassy. Because of the racist policy of the Nazi regime, the younger Dr. Rosen, who was sending reports to the German Foreign Ministry in Berlin about the Nanjing Massacre, was forced to retire from the diplomatic service in 1938.

== Selected bibliography ==
- 1890, Neupersischer Sprachführer, translated as Persian Colloquial Grammar, review: Carl D. Buck, The American Journal of Semitic Languages and Literatures (1898); reprint: Modern Persian colloquial grammar : containing a short grammar, dialogues, and extracts from Nasir-Eddin Shah's diaries, tales, etc., and a vocabulary, by Friedrich Rosen and Nāsir al-Din Shāh, Shah of Iran, New Delhi 2000, ISBN 81-206-1378-3.
- Oriental memories of a German Diplomatist. Methuen & co., London 1930.
- Omar Khayyam: Vierzeiler (Rubāʿīyāt) übersetzt von Friedrich Rosen mit Miniaturen von Hossein Behzad. Epubli, Berlin 2010. ISBN 978-3-86931-622-2 Details.
- Amir Theilhaber: Friedrich Rosen: Orientalist scholarship and international politics. De Gruyter Oldenbourg, Berlin 2020, ISBN 978-3-11-063925-4.
