= Georg Rosen (1821–1891) =

German (Lippe/Prussian) orientalist and diplomat

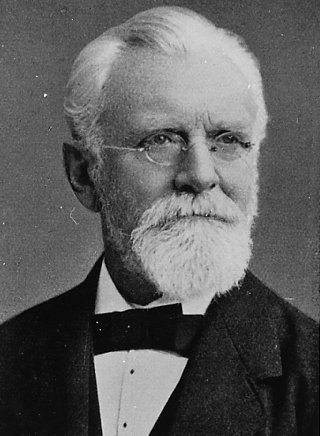
Georg Rosen.

Georg Friedrich Wilhelm Rosen (Born Ballhorn; 24 September 1820 in Detmold, Principality of Lippe – 29 October 1891 in Detmold) was a German (Lippe/Prussian) orientalist and diplomat.

== Biography ==
He studied in Berlin and Leipzig. From 1844, he was a dragoman at the Prussian embassy in Constantinople. From 1853 he was the Prussian consul in Jerusalem. From 1867 he was Consul General of the North German Confederation (from 1871, the German Empire) in Belgrade. In 1875, Rosen returned to Detmold, where, in May 1907, the Rosenstraße was named in his honor.

Rosen was a friend of E. A. Wallis Budge. Budge, together with his wife, spent a prolonged visit to Rosen's home in 1885.

== Family ==
The Orientalist Friedrich August Rosen was his brother; their father, Friedrich Ballhorn-Rosen, originating from Denmark, was Chancellor of the Principality of Lippe. Georg Rosen married Serena Anna (1830−1902), a painter, and daughter of the composer Ignaz Moscheles. By her he was father of Friedrich Rosen, also diplomat and for a short time German foreign minister, and Jelka Rosen, also a painter. His namesake grandson Georg Rosen (1895–1961) was also diplomat and helped organising the Nanking Safety Zone in 1937.

== Works ==
- Rudimenta persica (Leipzig, 1843)
- Über die Sprache der Lazen (Lemgo, 1844)
- Ossetische Grammatik (Lemgo, 1846).
- Tuti-nameh (Leipzig, 1858, 2 vols)
- Das Haram zu Jerusalem und der Tempelplatz des Moria (Gotha, 1866)
- Geschichte der Türkei vom Sieg der Reform 1826 bis zum Pariser Traktat 1856 (Leipzig, 1866–67, 2 vols.)
- Die Balkan-Haiduken (Leipzig, 1878)
- Bulgarische Volksdichtungen, ins Deutsche übertragen (Leipzig, 1879)
