= Ida Gerhardi =

German painter (1862–1927)

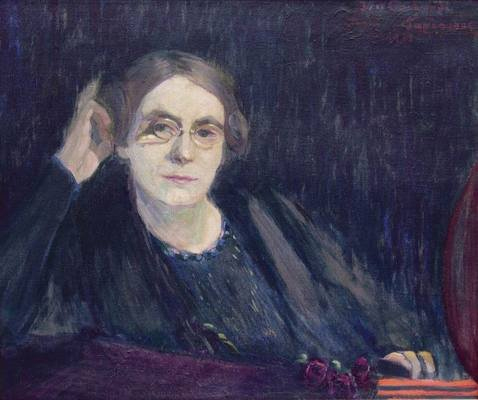
Self-portrait (1905)

Ida Gerhardi (2 August 1862 – 29 June 1927) was a German Neo-Impressionist painter who spent much of her career in Paris.

== Biography ==
She was born in Hagen on 2 August 1862. Her father was a medical doctor. After his early death in 1869, the family moved to Detmold, where she grew up. Although she had wanted to be a painter since she was a young girl, she was twenty-eight before she was able to pursue her ambitions. In 1890, she enrolled at the Women's Academy of the "Münchner Künstlerinnenverein" and studied with the landscape painter, Tina Blau.

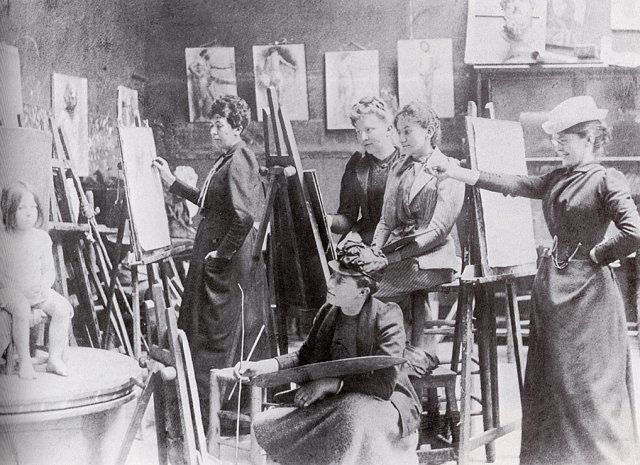
Ida Gerhardi (standing, 1st from right), Julie Wolfthorn (seated, 2nd from right), Jelka Rosen (standing, 3rd from right), Adele von Finck (bottom center), Dora Hitz (standing, 1st from left) as art students at Académie Colarossi, Montparnasse, Paris (circa 1892)

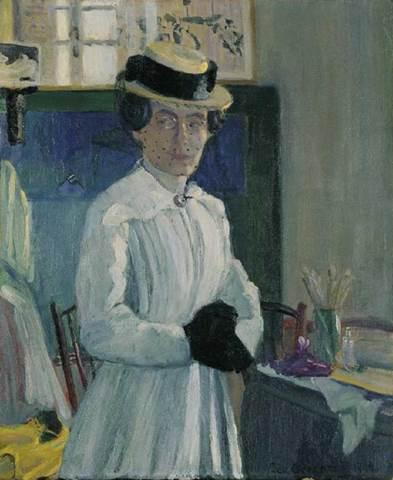
Self-portrait (1904)

In 1891, she moved to Paris, where she studied at the Académie Colarossi, a popular school for foreign students. There, she befriended the composer, Frederick Delius, and his future wife, the painter Jelka Rosen. In 1900, she made the acquaintance of Auguste Rodin and joined the artistic circle at Le Dôme Café.

At first, she worked as a landscape painter, inspired by the Barbizon school, but soon lightened her palette and began concentrating on portraits. She also did scenes from the amusement halls and pubs, which she visited with her friend, Käthe Kollwitz, at a time when it was just beginning to be acceptable for unaccompanied women to visit such establishments.

She organized her own exhibitions and sold her works largely by herself. She also made purchases on behalf of Karl Ernst Osthaus, the founder of the Museum Folkwang, including works by Rodin and Aristide Maillol. In 1907, she organized an exhibition of French art in Berlin at the Galerie Eduard Schulte then, in turn, an exhibition of German art at a gallery called "Les Tendances Nouvelles" in Paris. She was a member of the Deutscher Künstlerbund and participated in exhibitions by both the Munich Secession and the Berlin Secession.

Due to failing health, she had to give up her Paris studio in 1913 and return to Germany, where she lived with her relatives in Lüdenscheid. Her work never reflected wartime themes, but her correspondences between 1914 and 1918 regularly referenced the ongoing war. Gerhardi died in Lüdenscheid, Germany on 29 June 1927 from lung disease. Her remains were taken to Detmold.

Her work was included in the 2015 exhibition Empathy and Abstraction: Modern Women in Germany at the Kunsthalle Bielefeld.

== Ida Gerhardi Förderpreis ==
In 1989, the Lüdenscheid Savings Bank, in collaboration with the Städtische Galerie Lüdenscheid, established the "Ida Gerhardi Förderpreis" (Sponsorship Prize). It is currently (2017) worth 5,000 Euros. Notable recipients include Erich Reusch, Victor Bonato and Jochem Ahmann.

== Selected paintings ==
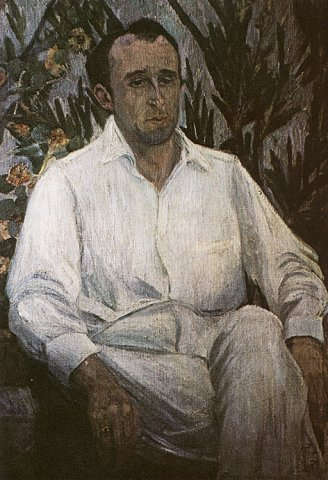
Frederick Delius

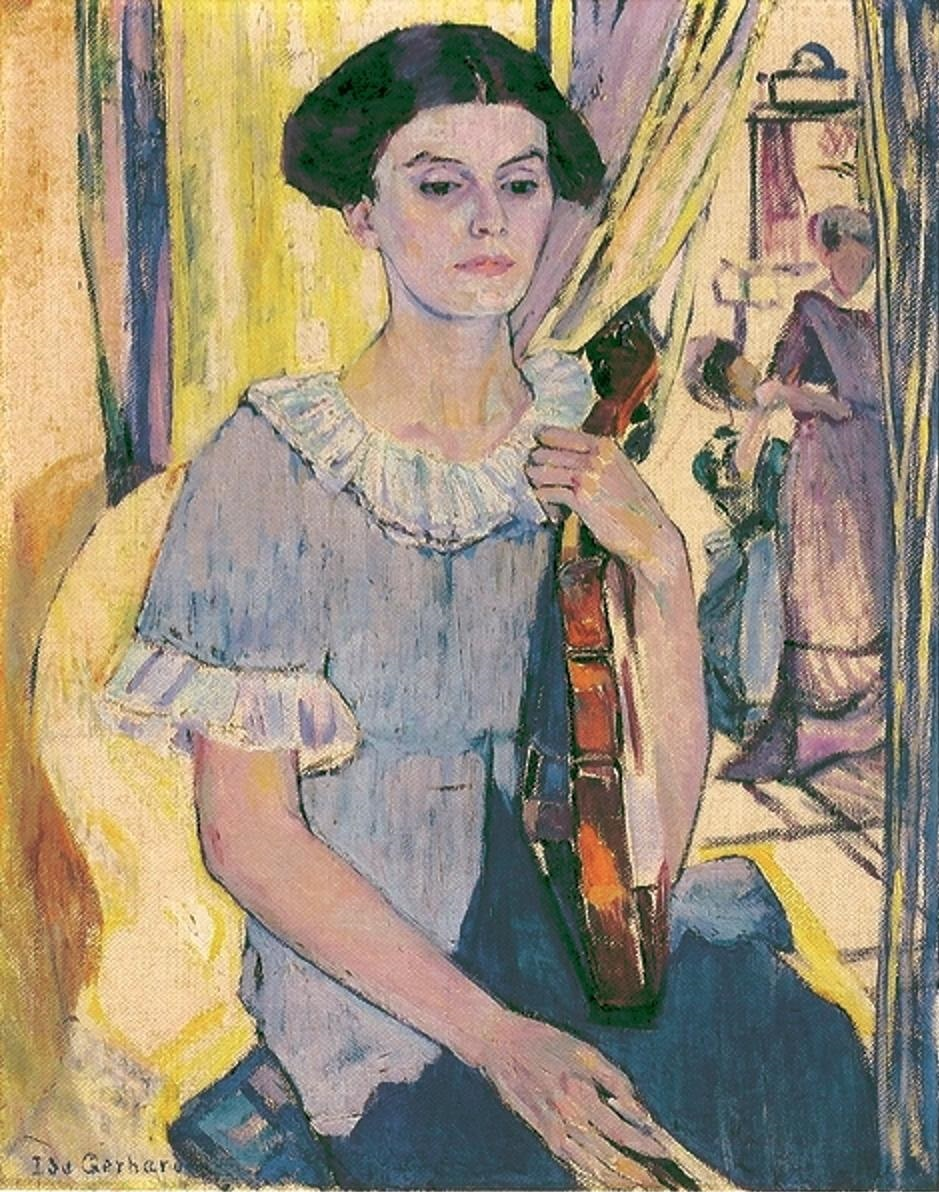
Violinist

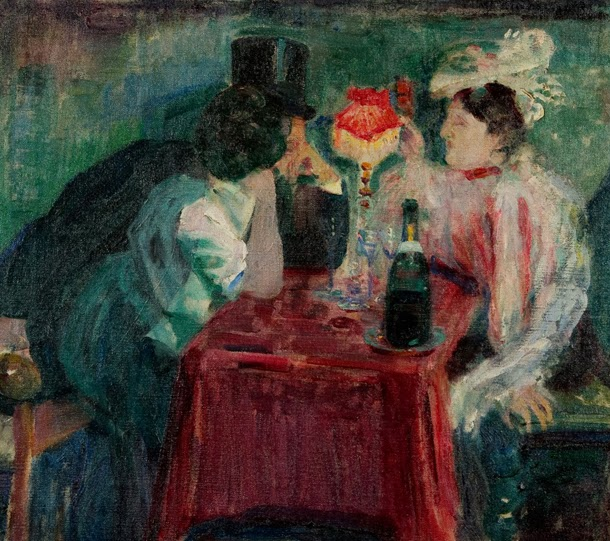
Bar Scene

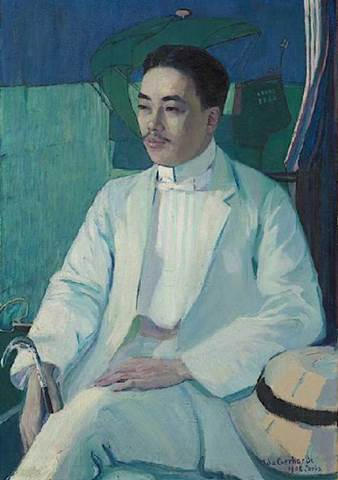
Siamese Prince
