= Georg Rosen (1895–1961) =

German lawyer and diplomat

Georg Rosen (14 September 1895, Shirvan, Iran – 22 July 1961 in Detmold) was a Rhodes Scholar, German lawyer and diplomat, best known for his assistance in helping to organize the Nanking Safety Zone during the Second Sino-Japanese War, while working for the German Foreign Office.

== Biography ==
Rosen was born in 1895 in Shirvan, Iran (then known as Persia), as son of Friedrich Rosen, who served a few months as German Foreign Minister in 1921. His father and his grandfather, who was also named Georg Rosen, were both noted Orientalists. His paternal grandmother Serena Anna Moscheles (1830-1902) and maternal grandmother Emily Moscheles (1827–1889) were sisters, and were of baptised Jewish parents, Ignaz Moscheles and his wife Charlotte Embden. In 1917, the youngest Rosen served as a volunteer on the Western Front during the First World War. After the war he completed his studies in 1921 and joined the German diplomatic service, carrying the academic designation of a Ph.D.

== Republic of China ==
From 1933 to 1938 Rosen was assigned to the German Embassy in China, acting as the Secretary of the Legation, and in 1937 worked in Nanjing (Nanking), the then-capital of the Republic of China.

During this period he worked together with German businessman John Rabe after the Japanese invasion of China, and during the Massacre of Nanjing. Along with other Westerners in the Nanking emergency committee, they established the Nanking Safety Zone in order to offer protection to the Chinese population of the region from Japanese atrocities carried out by their soldiers during the Nanjing Massacre. The Massacre lasted more than six weeks spanning the end of 1937 through early 1938. Together, the committee members helped to save more than 200,000 Chinese lives.

In 1938 he was forced to leave the diplomatic service due to his Jewish heritage and to avoid damaging the Nazi government's relations with the Japanese Imperial Army. Rosen then emigrated to London in 1938, and later to the United States where he taught at several universities. Rosen's role in the rescue of civilians was described in detail in the 2009 Sino-Franco-German movie John Rabe.

== Post-war service ==
After the war, Rosen returned to the Federal Republic of Germany and again joined the foreign diplomatic service. He served at the German embassy in London, and in Montevideo, where he was an Ambassador. Rosen retired in 1960.

After the Second World War Rosen, a Rhodes scholar himself, also worked to enable that Germans could be again among the Rhodes Scholarship recipients at the University of Oxford.

== See also ==
- John Rabe, head of the International Safety Zone Committee.
- Chiune Sugihara, Japanese vice-consul in Lithuania who helped save thousands of Jews, by allowing them to escape the then Stalinist, but later Nazi-occupied country.
- Oskar Schindler, German businessman and Nazi Party member who saved several thousand Jews during World War II.
- Abdol-Hossein Sardari, Iranian diplomat in Paris who helped Jewish people escape Nazi-occupied France by forging Iranian passports for them.
