= Hedwig Jaenichen-Woermann =

German artist (1879-1960)

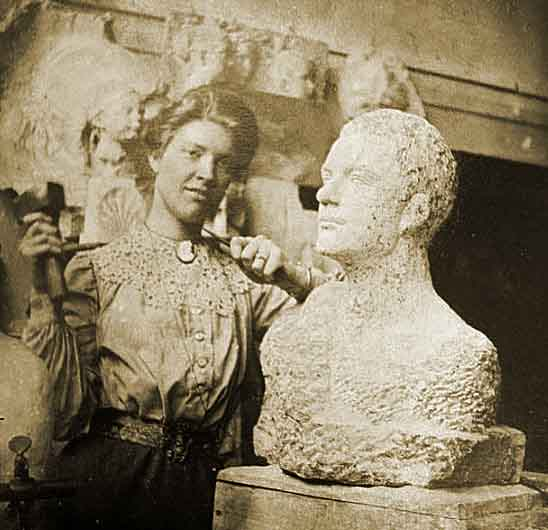
- Born: Hedwig Woermann; November 1, 1879; Hamburg, Germany
- Died: December 22, 1960 (aged 81); Wustrow, Germany

Hedwig Jaenichen-Woermann (1879-1960) was a German artist.

Jaenichen-Woermann was born on November 1, 1879 in Hamburg, Germany. She first studied with the painter Fritz Mackensen. She then moved to Paris, France to study with Antoine Bourdelle. in 1903 she moved to Rome, Italy, where she met and married fellow artist Hanns Jaenichen (1873-1945). The couple returned to Germany in 1909 at the beginning of World War I, eventually living in an artist colony in Ahrenshoop. she was a member of Verein der Berliner Künstlerinnen. Jaenichen-Woermann traveled extensively in Africa, Asia and South America, returning again to Germany before World War II.

The couple attempted suicide in 1945 due to their fear of the invasion of Germany by Soviet troops. Hanns died but Hedwig survived.

Jaenichen-Woermann died on December 22, 1960 in Wustrow, Germany.
