= List of German consuls in Jerusalem, Jaffa, Haifa and Eilat =

List of Consuls in Jerusalem, Jaffa, Haifa, and Eilat from German states. Prussia, the North German Confederacy and thereafter Germany maintained diplomatic missions in the Holy Land. The Jerusalem consulate was based on 57 Street of the Prophets at the corner with Wallenberg Street, Jerusalem. The Consulate also had affiliated vice-consulates in Jaffa and Haifa. The aim of the consulates was to represent the respective German states in the Holy Land or parts thereof. After Nazi Germany started the Second World War the consulates closed. In 1965 official diplomatic relations were established between the 1948 founded Israel and the 1949 founded West Germany. Since there is a German embassy in Tel Aviv, and later, as its affiliates, honorary consulates opened in Haifa and Eilat.

== List of consuls in Jerusalem as of 1842 ==
=== Prussian consuls ===
Before being elevated to a consulate of its own in 1845, the Prussian diplomatic mission in Jerusalem was a vice-consulate affiliated to the Prussian consulate in Ottoman Beirut. Occasionally consuls were personally ranked as consul general.

- 1842–1845: Ernst Gustav Schultz as vice-consul
- 1845–1851: Ernst Gustav Schultz as consul of Jerusalem
- 1852–1867: Dr. Georg Rosen
- 1867–1869: Prof. Julius Petermann

=== North German consul ===
In 1869 the Prussian consulate was taken over by the newly founded North German Confederacy.

- 1869–1871: Georg Friedrich August von Alten (till 21 June 1871 for the North German Confederacy), personally ranked consul general

=== German consuls and consuls general ===
On 22 June 1871 the North German consulate was taken over by the newly founded Germany. In 1872 the consular ambit comprised the Ottoman districts of Akka, Balqa-Nablus and Jerusalem. Consuls were occasionally personally ranked as consul general, however, only in 1913 the Jerusalem consulate was elevated to consulate general. After the British conquest of Jerusalem in 1917 and the German defeat in 1918 only in 1926 the consulate general reopened.

- 1871–1873: Georg Friedrich August von Alten (since 22 June 1871 for Germany), personally ranked consul general
- 1873–1874: Chancellor Otto Kersten, per pro
- 1874–1881: Thankmar von Münchhausen (1835–1909)
- 1881–1885: Dr. Julius Reitz
- 1886–1899: Dr. Paul Andreas von Tischendorf (1847–1914), as of 1898 personally ranked consul general
- 1899–1900: Dr. Friedrich Rosen
- 1901–1916: Edmund Schmidt (1855–1916), as consul general since 1914
- 1916–1917: Dr. Johann Wilhelm Heinrich Brode (1874-1936) as consul general
- 1917–1926: The Spanish consulate took care of the German citizens
  - 1921–1926: Karl Kapp (1889-1947) as German vice-consul attached to the Spanish consulate, 1936-1941 consul in Cleveland
- 1926–1932: Dr. Erich August Karl Nord (1889-1935) as consul general
- 1933–1935: Heinrich Wolff
- 1936–1939: Walter Döhle (1884-1945), as consul general
- 1939–1945: The Swiss consulate took care of the German citizens

== List of consuls in Jaffa as of 1872 ==
Before the formal establishment of a vice-consulate affiliated with the Jerusalem consulate, there were consular agents, affiliated with the consulate in Beirut. In 1872, the mission in Jaffa was elevated to a vice-consulate, advancing again in 1914 to consulate, remaining throughout affiliated to the Jerusalem consulate (general; as of 1913). With the British conquest of Jaffa in 1917, the consulate closed. The London Gazette of 23 December 1932 circumscribes the consular ambit as follows: Tel Aviv, Jaffa and the coast south thereof incl. Ghazzah with the hinterland also comprising Lydda, Ramleh, Sarona, Tulkarm und Wilhelma.

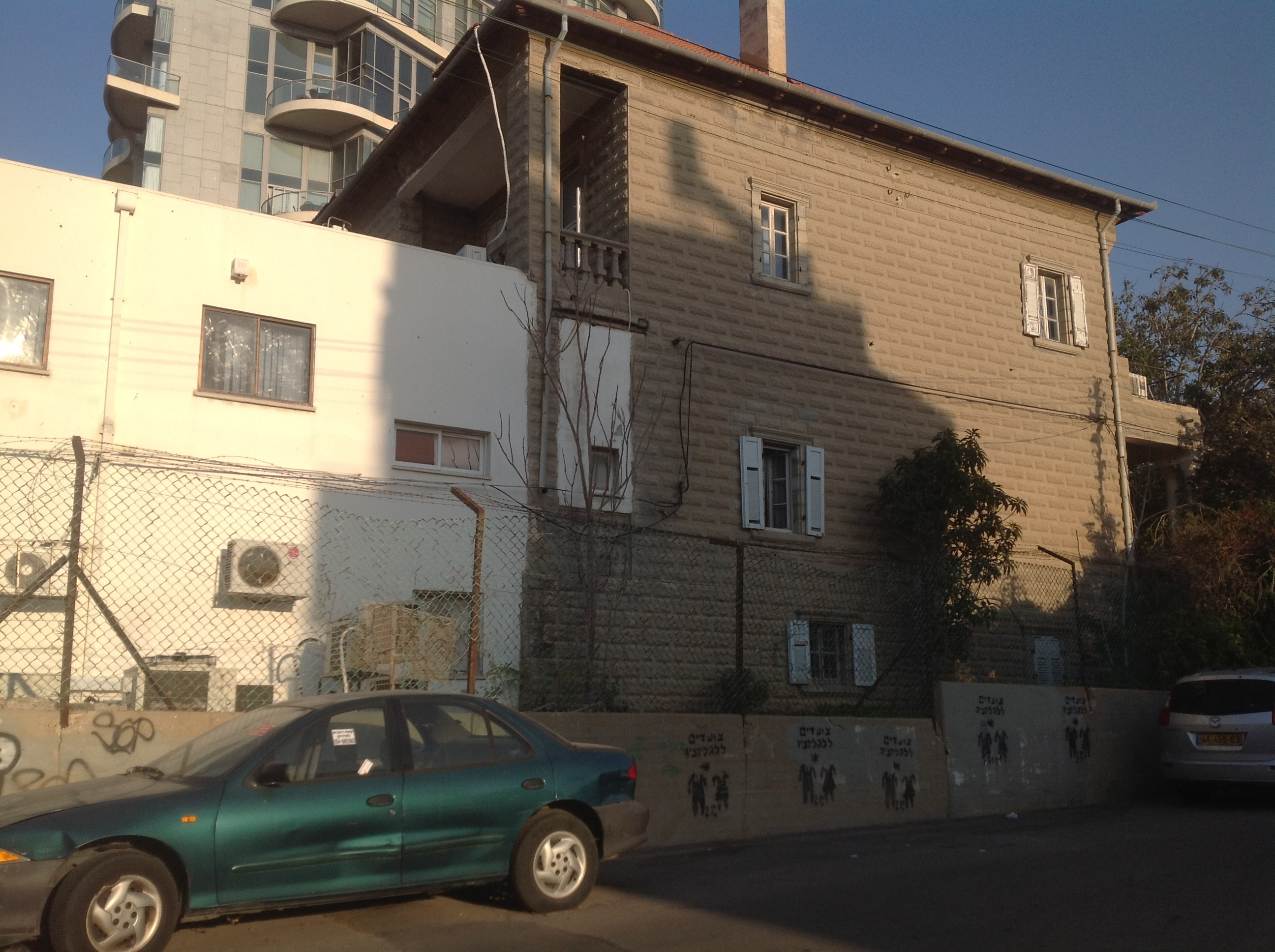
The former consulate (right) in Jaffa, Tel Aviv, built 1913-1915 by Karl Appel

- 1872–1897: Simeon Murad
- 1897–1901: Edmund Schmidt
- 1901–1905: Dr. Eugen Büge (1859–1936)
- 1905–1908: Walter Rößler
- 1908–1910: vacancy?
- 1910–1916: Dr. Johann Wilhelm Heinrich Brode (1874-1936), till 1911 only per pro, as of 1911 as vice-consul, as of 1914 as consul
- 1916–1917: Karl Emil Schabinger von Schowingen
- 1917-1926: The German consulate in Jaffa remained closed
- 1926-1932: ?
- 1932-1939: Timotheus Wurst (1874-1961)

== List of consuls in Haifa as of 1877 ==
Originally a vice-consulate, the Haifa mission was affiliated to the Jerusalem consulate. After the Jerusalem mission had been elevated to consulate general in 1913, the Haifa mission became a consulate in 1914. The London Gazette of 25 March 1938 circumscribes the Haifa consular ambit as follows: Haifa and her hinterland including Acre, Bosra, Jenin, Nazareth, Safed and Tiberias. The Haifa consulate closed with the British conquest of Haifa on 23 September 1918 till 1926 and again in 1939. An honorary consulate-general was opened after 1989.

- 1877–1878:
- 1878–1908: Friedrich Keller (1838-1913)
- 1909: Theodor Georg Weber
- 1909–1915: Julius Löytved-Hardegg
- 1915–1918:
  - 1915–1917: vacancy
  - 1917, 10 May to 10 August: Hermann Hoffmann-Fölkersamb, per pro
  - 10 August 1917 to 2 April 1918: Friedrich Werner von der Schulenburg, per pro
  - 1918, 2 April to 20 June: Dr. Kurt Max Paul Ziemke
- 1918–1926: no German mission in Haifa
- 1926–1937: ?
- 1937–1939: Wilhelm Melchers
- 1939–1989: no German mission in Haifa
- 1989 to present: Michael Pappe, honorary consul general

== List of consuls in Eilat ==
An honorary consulate was opened after 1965.

- 2005 to present: Barbara Pfeffer
