= List of compositions by Frederick Delius =

Frederick Delius, photographed in 1907

The musical compositions of Frederick Delius (1862–1934) cover numerous genres, in a style that developed from the early influences of composers such as Edvard Grieg and Richard Wagner into a voice that was uniquely Delius's. He began serious composition at a relatively advanced age (his earliest songs date to his early twenties), and his music was largely unknown and unperformed until the early 20th century. It was a further ten years before his work was generally accepted in concert halls, and then more often in Europe than in his home country, England. Ill-health caused him to give up composition in the early 1920s and he was silent for several years, before the services of a devoted amanuensis, Eric Fenby, enabled Delius to resume composing in 1928. The Delius-Fenby combination led to several notable late works.

== Chronological list of principal works ==
The "principal" works are those identified as such by Eric Fenby. A division of Delius's work into phases such as "apprentice" and "middle period" has been suggested by many commentators, notably Anthony Payne in "Delius's Stylistic Development" (1962).

=== Apprentice works, 1887–1899 ===
- 1887: Florida Suite
- 1890–92: (Opera) Irmelin
- 1893–95: (Opera) The Magic Fountain
- 1895–97: (Opera) Koanga
- 1897: (Incidental music) Folkeraadet (Norwegian Suite)
- 1897: Concerto for piano and orchestra (original version)
- 1899: Paris: The Song of a Great City

=== "Middle period" works, 1900–06 ===
- 1900–01: (Opera) A Village Romeo and Juliet
  - (Orchestral interlude between Scenes 5 and 6) "The Walk to the Paradise Garden"
- 1902: (Opera) Margot-la-Rouge
- 1903: Appalachia: Variations on a Slave Song
- 1903–04: Sea Drift (setting of a poem by Walt Whitman)
- 1904–05: A Mass of Life (text by Friedrich Nietzsche)
- 1906: Concerto for piano and orchestra (with revised first movement)
- 1906–07: Songs of Sunset (poems by Ernest Dowson)

=== Mature works, 1907–24 ===
- 1907: Brigg Fair
- 1908: In a Summer Garden
- 1909–10: (Opera) Fennimore and Gerda
- 1911: An Arabesque (poems by Jens Peter Jacobsen)
- 1911: A Song of the High Hills (wordless chorus)
- 1911–12: Summer Night on the River
- 1911–12: On Hearing the First Cuckoo in Spring
- 1912: Life's Dance (revised from 1899 symphonic poem La ronde se déroule)
- 1913–14: North Country Sketches
- 1914: Sonata for violin and piano No. 1 (begun 1905)
- 1914–16: Requiem (text by Heinrich Simon)
- 1915: Double Concerto for violin, cello and orchestra
- 1916: Concerto for violin and orchestra
- 1916: Dance Rhapsody No. 2
- 1916: String Quartet
- 1916: Sonata for cello and piano
- 1917: Eventyr (Once Upon a Time)
- 1918: A Song Before Sunrise
- 1920–23: (Incidental music) Hassan (play by James Elroy Flecker)
- 1921: Cello Concerto
- 1923: Sonata for violin and piano No. 2

=== Late works ===
- 1929–30: A Song of Summer
- 1930: Sonata for violin and piano No. 3
- 1930: Songs of Farewell (setting of poems by Walt Whitman)

== List of works by genre ==
A definitive catalogue of the works of Delius was produced by Robert Threlfall in 1977, and a supplement to it in 1986. It is abbreviated as RT. The Threlfall sectioning is a categorization where works are assigned nominal numbers according to a roman-numeric genre numbering scheme. For example, A Village Romeo and Juliet is, according to Threlfall's counting, the sixth piece of dramatic work Delius composed. Thus, the piece is in Section I, number 6, so is designated RT I/6.

=== Dramatic works ===
Year(s) composed	RT	Title	Genre	First performance	Comments	Ref.
1888	I/1	Zanoni	Incidental music			
1890–92	I/2	Irmelin	Opera	Oxford, 4 May 1953	Libretto: E. Graham, T. Round	
1893–95	I/3	The Magic Fountain	Lyric drama	Broadcast performance, BBC 1977	Libretto: Delius	
1895	I/4	Koanga	Lyric drama	Elberfeld, 30 March 1904	Libretto: Charles Francis Keary, after George Washington Cable	
1897	I/5	Folkeraadet	Incidental music	Christiania, October 1897	Play by Gunnar Heiberg	
1900–01	I/6	A Village Romeo and Juliet	Lyric drama	Berlin, 21 October 1907	Libretto: Delius, after Gottfried Keller. The orchestral interlude between Scenes 5 and 6, "The Walk to the Paradise Garden", is often performed and recorded separately.	
1902	I/7	Margot la rouge	Lyric drama		Libretto: I. Rosenval	
1909–10	I/8	Fennimore and Gerda	Opera	Frankfurt am Main, October 1919	Libretto: Delius, after J.P. Jacobsen	
1920–23	I/9	Hassan	Incidental music	Darmstadt, 1 June 1923; Full version first performed in London, 30 September 1923	Play by James Elroy Flecker	

=== Works for voices and orchestra ===
Year(s) composed	RT	Title	Vocal forces	First performance	Comments	Ref.
1898	II/1	Mitternachtslied Zarathustras (The Midnight Song of Zarathustra)	Male chorus			
1903	II/2	Appalachia: Variations on a slave song	Choir, baritone solo	Elberfeld, 1904		
1903–04	II/3	Sea Drift	Choir, baritone solo	Essen, 24 May 1906		
1904–05	II/4	A Mass of Life	Double choir, SATB soloists	London, 7 June 1909	Part II was performed in Munich, in 1908	
1906–07	II/5	Songs of Sunset	Choir, Mezzo-soprano & baritone soloists	London, 16 June 1911		
1911	II/6	A Song of the High Hills	Choir, tenor & soprano soloists	London, 26 February 1920	Textless chorus	
1911	II/7	An Arabesque	Choir and baritone soloist	Newport, 1920		
1914–16	II/8	Requiem	Choir, soprano & baritone soloists	London, 23 March 1922		
1930	II/9	Songs of Farewell	Choir	London, 21 March 1932		
1930–32	II/10	Idyll: Once I passed through a populous city	Soprano & baritone soloists	London, 3 October 1933	Music adapted from Margot la rouge; words from Walt Whitman; after the first performance, Delius expanded the work and renamed it Prelude and Idyll	

=== Works for solo voice and orchestra ===
Year(s) composed	RT	Title	Vocal forces	First performance	Comments	Ref.
1888	III/1	Paa Vidderne (Melodrama)	Recitation		Revised (1891) as orchestral suite	
1889	III/2	Sakuntala	Tenor soloist			
1891	III/3	Maud (from Tennyson)	Tenor soloist			
1897	III/4	Seven Danish Songs: 1. "Summer Nights (On the Sea Shore)"; 2. "Red Roses (Through Long, Long Years)"; 3. "Wine Roses"; 4. "Let Springtime Come, Then" (Den Lenz laβ kommen); 5. "Irmelin Rose"; 6. "In the Seraglio Garden"; 7. "Silken Shoes"	Solo voice (unspecified)	Paris, 1901		
1907	III/5	Cynara	Baritone soloist	London, 18 October 1929	Left incomplete, finished in 1929	
1925	III/6	A Late Lark	Solo voice (unspecified)			

=== Works for unaccompanied voices ===
Year(s) composed	RT	Title	Vocal forces/accompaniment	First performance	Comments	Ref.
before 1887	IV/1	Six German part-songs: 1. "Lorelei" (H. Heine); 2. "Oh! Sonnenschein" (Oh! Sunshine); 3. "Durch den Wald" (By the Forest) [von Schreck]; 4. "Ave Maria"; 5. "Sonnenscheinlied" (Sunshine Song) [Bjornsen]; 6. "Fruhlingsanbruch" [Bjornsen]	Choir, unaccompanied			
1907	IV/2	On Craig Ddu	Soprano, alto, 2 tenor, 2 bass, piano	Blackpool, 1907		
1908	IV/3	Wanderer's Song	2 tenor, 2 bass, piano			
1908	IV/4	Midsummer Song	2 soprano, 2 alto, 2 tenor, 2 bass, piano	Whitley Bay, December 1910		
1917	IV/5	Two Songs to be sung of a summer night on the water	Soprano, alto, 2 tenor, 2 basses, unaccompanied	London, 28 June 1920	Also arranged for string orchestra by Eric Fenby in 1932, titled Two Aquarelles.	
1923	IV/6	The splendour falls on castle walls (from Tennyson)	Chorus, unaccompanied	London, 17 June 1924		

=== Songs with piano accompaniment ===
Year(s) composed	RT	Title	Comments	Ref.
undated	V/1	"When other lips shall speak"	Unpublished	
undated	V/4	"Der Fichtenbaum" (The Spruce Tree)	Unpublished	
1885	V/2	"Over the mountains high"	Unpublished	
1885	V/3	"Zwei braune Augen" (Two Brown Eyes)	Unpublished	
1888	V/5	Five Songs from the Norwegian: 1. "Slumber Song" (Bjørnsen); 2. "The Nightingale" (Wellhaven); 3. "Summer's Eve" (Paulsen); 4. "Longing" (Kjerulf); 5. "Sunset" (Munck)		
1888	V/6	"Hochgebirgsleben" (High Mountain Life)	Unpublished	
1888	V/7	"O schneller mein Ross" ( O faster, my Ross)	Unpublished	
1889	V/8	"Chanson (de) Fortunio"	Unpublished	
1889–90	V/9	Seven Songs from the Norwegian: 1. "Cradle Song" (Ibsen); 2. "The Homeward Journey" (Vinje); 3. "Twilight Fancies" (Bjørnsen); 4. "Sweet Venevil" (Bjørnsen); 5. "Minstrel" (Ibsen); 6. "Love concealed" (Bjørnsen); 7. "The Birds Story" (Ibsen)		
1890	V/10	"Skogen gir susende langsom besked" (Softly the Forest)	Unpublished	
1890–91	V/11	Songs to words by Heine: 1. "Mit deinen blauen Augen" (With your blue eyes); 2. "Ein schöner Stern geht auf in meiner Nacht" (A shining star appears in my night); 3. "Hör' ich das Liedchen klingen" (I hear the sound of singing); 4. "Aus deinen Augen fliessen meine Leider" (From your eyes flows my song)	Unpublished	
1891	V/12	Three English songs [Shelley]: 1. "Indian Love Song"; 2. "Love's Philosophy" 3. "To the Queen of my Heart"		
1891	V/13	"Lyse Naetter"	Unpublished	
1893	V/14	"Jeg horde en nyskaaren Seljeflojte" (I once had a newly cut willow pipe)	Unpublished	
1893	V/15	"Nuages" (Clouds)	Unpublished	
1895	V/16	Deux Melodies [Verlaine]: 1. "Il pleure dans mon coeur" (It cries in my heart); 2. "Le ciel est, par-dessus le toit" (The sky is over the roof)	Accompaniment later orchestrated	
1895	V/17	"Pagen hojt paa Taarnet sad" (The page sat in the lofty tower)	Unpublished	
1898	V/18	"Traum Rosen" (Dream Roses)	Unpublished	
1898	V/19	Lieder nach Gedichten von Friedrich Nietzsche (Songs after poems by Fredrich Nietzsche): 1. "Nach neuen Meeren" (By New Seas); 2. "Der Wanderer" (The Wanderer); 3. "Der Einsame" (The Lonely One); 4. "Der Wanderer und sein Schatten" (The Wanderer and his Shadow)		
1898	V/20	"Im Glück wir lachend gingen" (In bliss we walked with laughter)		
1900	V/21	Two songs from the Danish: 1. "The Violet"; 2. "Autumn"	"The Violet" accompaniment orchestrated, 1908	
1900	V/22	"Black Roses"		
1901	V/23	"Jeg horer i Natten" (I hear in the night)	Unpublished	
1902	V/24	"Summer Landscape"	Orchestral accompaniment 1903	
1910	V/25	"The Nightingale has a Lyre of Gold"		
1911	V/26	"La Lune blanche" (The white moon) (Verlaine poem)	Orchestral accompaniment 1911	
1911	V/27	"Chanson d'Automne" (Song of Autumn) (Verlaine poem)		
1913	V/28	"I-Brasil"		
1913	V/29	Two songs for children: 1. "Little Birdie"; 2. "The Streamlet's Slumber Song"		
1915–16	V/30	Four old English lyrics: 1. "It was a lover and his lass"; 2. "So white, so soft, so sweet is she"; 3. "Spring, the sweet Spring"; 4. "To Daffodils"		
1919	V/31	"Avant que tu ne t'en ailles" (Morning Star)		

=== Works for orchestra alone ===
Year(s) composed	RT	Title	First performance	Comments	Ref.
1887	VI/1	Florida Suite	Leipzig, 1888	Revised 1889	
1888	VI/2	Hiawatha (tone poem)			
1888	VI/3	Rhapsodic Variations		Incomplete	
1888	VI/4	Three pieces for string orchestra			
1889	VI/5	Idylle de Printemps			
1889–90	VI/6	Orchestral suite (Petite Suite No. 1): 1. Marche; 2. Berceuse; 3. Scherzo; 4. Duo; 5. Theme with variations	London, 18 November 1946		
1889 (approx.)	VI/6a	Suite of 3 Characteristic pieces: 1. La Quadroöne (Rhadsodie Floridienne); 2. Scherzo; 3. Marche Caprice			
1889 (approx)	VI/6b	Marche Française			
1890	VI/7	Three small tone-poems: 1. Summer Evening; 2. Winter Night (Sleigh Ride); 3. Spring Morning	London, 2 January 1949		
1890 (approx.)	VI/8	A l'Amore			
1890	VI/9	Orchestral Suite (Petite Suite No. 2): 1. Allegro ma non troppo 2. Con moto 3. Allegretto			
1890–92	VI/10	Paa Vidderne (On the Mountains) - symphonic poem	Christiania, Norway, 10 October 1891		
c. 1891		Mazurka		Incomplete sketch	
1895–97	VI/11	Over the hills and far away (fantasy overture)	London, 30 May 1899		
1896	VI/12	Appalachia: an American rhapsody		Orchestral version, later adapted for solo and chorus	
1899	VI/13	La Ronde se déroule (The Dance Goes On)	London, 30 May 1899	Revised, 1901, as "Lebenstanz" (Life's Dance)	
1899	VI/14	Paris: The Song of a Great City	Elberfeld, 1901		
1901	VI/15	Lebenstanz (Life's Dance)	Düsseldorf, February 1904	Further revised, 1912	
1907	VI/16	Brigg Fair	Basel, 1907		
1908	VI/17	In a Summer Garden	London, 11 December 1909	Delius conducted the first performance	
1908	VI/18	Dance Rhapsody (No. 1)	Hereford (Three Choirs Festival) 8 September 1909	Delius conducted the first performance	
1911–12	VI/19	Two pieces for small orchestra: 1. On Hearing the First Cuckoo in Spring; 2. Summer Night on the River	Leipzig, 2 October 1913		
1912	VI/15	Life's Dance (final version)	Berlin, 15 November 1912.	Revised from 1901	
1913–14	VI/20	North Country Sketches	London, 10 May 1915		
1915	VI/21	Air and Dance	London, Aeolian Hall, 16 October 1929		
1916	VI/22	Dance Rhapsody (No. 2)			
1917	VI/23	Eventyr (Once Upon a Time)	London. 11 January 1919		
1918	VI/24	A Song before Sunrise			
1918	VI/25	Poem of Life and Love		Incomplete, lost	
1929-30	VI/26	A Song of Summer	London, 17 September 1932		
1931	VI/27	Irmelin prelude			
1931	VI/28	Fantastic Dance	London, 12 January 1934		
undated		On the moors (Impressions of Nature)		Incomplete sketch	
undated		Sunday morning on the moors		Incomplete sketch	
undated		Mountain poem		Incomplete sketch	

=== Works for solo instrument(s) and orchestra ===
Year(s) composed	RT	Title	First performance	Comments	Ref.
1888	VII/1	Suite for violin and orchestra			
1890	VII/2	Legendes (Sagen) for piano and orchestra			
1895	VII/3	Legende for violin and orchestra		Later revised for violin and piano	
1897	VII/4	Piano Concerto in C minor	Elberfeld, 1904	1st movement revised 1906	
	VII/4a	Rhapsody for piano and orchestra			
1915	VII/5	Double Concerto for violin and violoncello	London, 21 February 1920		
1916	VII/6	Violin Concerto	London, 30 January 1919		
1921	VII/7	Cello Concerto	Vienna, 30 January 1923		
1930	VII/8	Caprice and Elegy for cello and chamber orchestra			
undated		Second Piano Concerto		Incomplete sketch	
undated		Fantaisie for piano and orchestra		Incomplete sketch	

=== Chamber music ===
Year(s) composed	RT	Title	Instrumental forces	First performance	Comments	Ref.
1888	VIII/1	First string quartet				
1889	VIII/2	Romance	Violin, piano			
c. 1890		Vasantasena for violin and piano	Violin and piano		Incomplete sketch	
1892	VIII/3	Violin Sonata in B major	Violin, piano	Achille Rivarde with Harold Bauer, Paris 1893 (private performance)		
1893	VIII/4	Second string quartet				
1896	VIII/5	Romance	Cello, piano			
1905–14	VIII/6	Violin Sonata No. 1	Violin, piano	Manchester, 1915		
1916	VIII/7	Cello Sonata	Cello, piano	London, 11 January 1919		
1916	VIII/8	String quartet (1916)		London, 1 February 1919		
1923	VIII/9	Violin Sonata No. 2	Violin and piano	London, 7 October 1924		
c. 1923		Sonata for violin and piano in C	Violin and piano		Incomplete sketch	
1930	VIII/10	Violin Sonata No. 3	Violin and piano	London, 6 November 1930		

=== Piano solos ===
Year(s) composed	RT	Title	First performance	Comments	Ref.
1885	IX/1	Zum Carnival		written before first departure from Florida	
undated	IX/2	Pensees mélodieuses (Melodious thoughts)			
undated	IX/3	Norwegian Sleigh Ride			
undated	IX/4	Badinage (Danse lente)			
undated	IX/5	Two piano pieces: 1. Valse; 2. Reverie			
1919	IX/6	Dance for Harpsichord			
1922–23	IX/7	Five piano pieces: 1–2. Mazurka and Waltz for a Little Girl; 3. Waltz; 4. Lullaby for a Modern Baby; 5. Toccata			
1923	IX/8	Three piano preludes: 1. Scherzando; 2. Quick; 3. Con moto	London 4 September 1924		
undated		Presto leggiero for piano		Unpublished piano solo	
