= English Pastoral School =

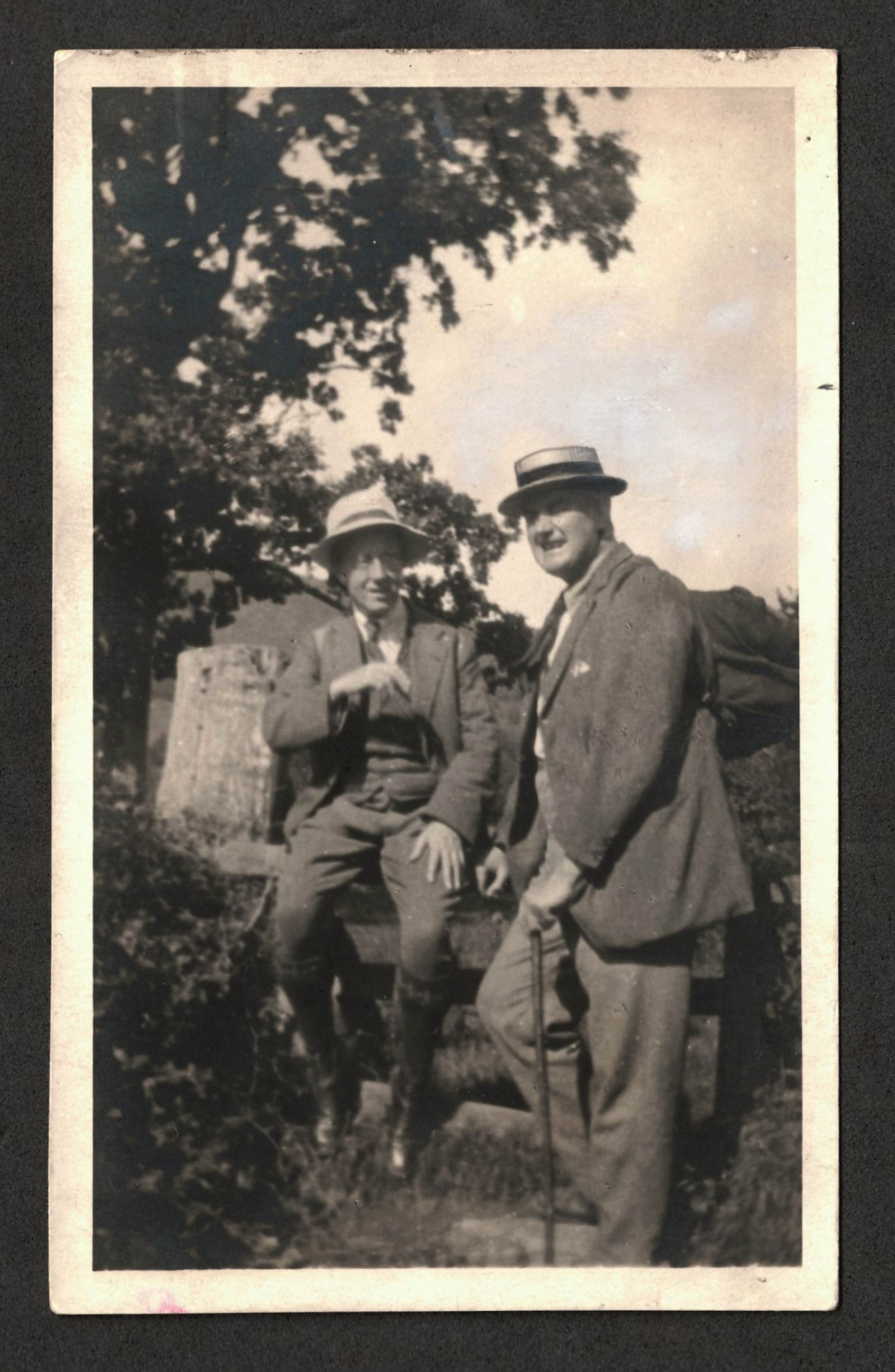
Gustav Holst and Ralph Vaughan Williams walking in the Malvern Hills, September 1921

The English Pastoral School, sometimes called the English Nationalist School or by detractors the Cow Pat School, is an informal designation for a group of English composers of classical music working during the early to mid 20th century, who sought to build a distinctively English style of music by composing in a style informed by Tudor music and English folk music, and often explicitly evoking the English countryside.

The leading composers associated with the school were Ralph Vaughan Williams, Frederick Delius and Gustav Holst, with other notable figures including George Butterworth, John Ireland, Frank Bridge, Edmund Rubbra, Gerald Finzi, Herbert Howells, Ernest John Moeran and Peter Warlock.

== Stylistic features ==
The English Pastoral school was not a formal group and the composers associated with the style were not necessarily collaborators nor associates, nor did they share any kind of manifesto. As a result, there is some degree of debate about which works, and which composers, should and should not be considered a part of the school. Nevertheless, the following key threads can be identified:

- An interest in, and influence by, English folk music; whether by directly setting folk melodies for classical instrumentation, quoting folk melodies within larger works, or more often by composing original music drawing on folk music, for example with modal melodies and harmony.
- Particularly in choral music, a similar influence of the music of the English renaissance, for example that of Thomas Tallis and William Byrd.
- Composing music evoking the English countryside; often explicitly and programmatically.
- The setting of English poetry in vocal and choral contexts, particularly by poets associated with pastoral themes such as A. E. Housman or Thomas Hardy.

A composer's association with the school does not necessarily indicate that all of their music displays all or any of these features, and even Vaughan Williams – perhaps the name most frequently associated with the concept – composed music well outside these stipulations (such as in his fourth and sixth symphonies).

== Precursors ==
Following the death of Henry Purcell in 1695, art-music in England drew largely from that of the European continent. While London was a significant centre of European music-making, many of its most important musical figures were foreign-born naturalised citizens like Handel and Muzio Clementi; touring continental composers such as Haydn, Mozart and Felix Mendelssohn also enjoyed considerable popularity in England. While native English composers in the nineteenth century, such as Cipriani Potter and William Sterndale Bennett enjoyed some popularity in their day, their music drew mainly on continental (especially German) models and their music is rarely performed today.

The final decades of the nineteenth century saw something of a renaissance of native English music in the figures of Arthur Sullivan, Hubert Parry, Charles Villiers Stanford and especially Edward Elgar, one of the most famous of all English composers and the most noteworthy of those whose models were primarily continental. Whilst these composers' music, like those of their precursors, drew largely on German models (especially Johannes Brahms), the professionalism and the quality of their output have ensured it a more lasting place in the repertoire.

Whilst Elgar was by far the most artistically successful of these composers, the most important from the perspective of the English Pastoral School was Stanford. Whilst Stanford's own music is not normally considered as part of the school, within it can be seen some hints of what was to come: in his incorporation of folk-song elements for example. Of greater significance was his role as a teacher: as a founder of the Royal College of Music as well as teaching music at Cambridge University his many pupils included Ralph Vaughan Williams, Gustav Holst, John Ireland and Frank Bridge, who would go on to form most of the first generation of composers in the pastoral school.

== First generation ==
Perhaps the archetypical composer, and the one most closely associated with the style, was Ralph Vaughan Williams (1872–1958). Many of the works with which he is most strongly associated, such as the Fantasia on a Theme by Thomas Tallis and The Lark Ascending exhibit the main stylistic influences associated with the school. Vaughan Williams also collected folk songs (much as many composers did in Europe during the period), and arranged some of these such as in his Norfolk Rhapsody. Other key early composers were Vaughan Williams's friend Gustav Holst, John Ireland, and Herbert Howells, all of whom had studied under Stanford at various points.

Howells composed a large body of chamber works with strong pastoral elements that immediately place them within the style; such as his third String Quartet subtitled In Gloucestershire. Perhaps Howells' main legacy however was as the key figure in the revival of the English (and particularly the Anglican) choral tradition, drawing on Renaissance music in choral music such as his Requiem and Stabat Mater.

Gustav Holst is often cited as a key early member of the school, although his stylistic influences were extremely broad and drew as much if not more on Classical mythology, Eastern philosophy and Sanskrit literature as native influences. Relatively few of his works are overtly pastoral in character, however there are notable examples such as the symphonic poem Egdon Heath and his single symphony, subtitled The Cotswolds.

Standing somewhat apart from these was Frederick Delius, who was also older. His works, while certainly drawing on folk and pastoral elements, were as likely to do so from American models (Delius worked briefly in the United States during the 1880s). However, works such as the mature tone poems Brigg Fair (1907), In a Summer Garden (1908, revised 1911), Summer Night on the River (1911), and On Hearing the First Cuckoo in Spring (1912) certainly exhibit an English pastoral character.

George Butterworth, a victim of World War I, composed only a very small amount of music in his short life; however most of what he did write explicitly evokes the English countryside, such as his settings of A. E. Housman's poetic cycle A Shropshire Lad.

== Later generation ==
Later composers associated with the style include E. J. Moeran, who had thoroughly digested the pastoral idiom of Vaughan Williams and whose music is perhaps the purest archetype of the English Pastoral Style; and Edmund Rubbra, who sought to evolve and further develop the style. Ruth Gipps was another composer of the second half of the twentieth century whose music bears many of the stylistic hallmarks, though by the time it was composed her music could be described as reactionary; and in fact this later generation of composers are somewhat outside the mainstream of English music in the middle of the twentieth century, as perhaps typified by composers such as Benjamin Britten, William Walton and Michael Tippett, whose music may in fact be understood as a reaction against the pastoral and folk elements of the English pastoral school.

The choral tradition as established by Howells was a significant impact on later composers, however, and its influence can be heard in later composers who have written extensively for religious purposes such as John Tavener, Scottish composer James MacMillan and the Welshman William Mathias.

== Bibliography ==
- Howes, Frank (1966), The English Musical Renaissance, London: Secker & Warburg, OCLC 955517936
- Hughes, Meirion; Stradling, Robert (2001), The English Musical Renaissance, 1840-1940: Constructing a National Music, Music and Society, Manchester: Manchester University Press, ISBN 0719058309
- Rayborn, Tim (2016), A New English Music: Composers and Folk Traditions in England's Musical Renaissance from the Late 19th to the Mid-20th Century, Jefferson, North Carolina: McFarland & Company, ISBN 978-1476624945
