= Hans Haym =

German conductor (1860–1921)

Haym with Delius in 1909

Hans Haym (29 November 1860 – 15 February 1921) was a German conductor of the late nineteenth and early twentieth centuries. As musical director in the town of Elberfeld he championed the works of the then unknown English composer Frederick Delius before that composer's works were heard in his native country.

== Biography ==
Haym was born in Halle. He was educated at the universities of Jena and Tübingen, where he studied philosophy and classical philology. After graduating, he studied music in Munich, including classes in composition, the piano, organ and singing.

Haym succeeded Julius Buths as conductor of the Concert Society, or Elberfelder Concertgesellchaft, in 1890. On 17 December 1892 he programmed works of Beethoven, the Kantate auf den Tod Kaiser Josephs II (cantata in memory of Joseph II), his Piano Concerto No. 5 and his Ninth Symphony, with soloists Julia Uzielli, Jenny Hahn, Franz Naval and Anton Sistermans. Despite the conservative tastes of his audiences he programmed new music when he could, including early performances of Richard Strauss's Till Eulenspiegel's Merry Pranks in 1895 and Delius's Over the hills and far away (under its German title Über die Berge in die Ferne) in 1897 and his Paris: The Song of a Great City in 1899. He introduced Delius's music to Buths, who had gone from Elberfeld to the more important musical directorship of Düsseldorf. Buths, who was later an early exponent of Elgar's music, also became an admirer of Delius's work.

Haym also introduced Delius's music to Fritz Cassirer, musical director of the Stadttheater, Elberfeld, where Delius's opera Koanga was premiered in 1904. At about this time, Haym fell ill and was obliged to convalesce in the Tirol.

Haym hoped to be appointed to the more prestigious musical directorship of Strasbourg, but was unsuccessful. At Elberfeld, Haym and his orchestra attracted leading musicians to appear with them, including Raoul Pugno, Eugène Ysaÿe, Pablo Casals, Ferruccio Busoni and Artur Schnabel. He retired from the musical directorship in 1920 and died in Elberfeld at the age of 60 on 15 February 1921.
