= English Pastoral =

English Pastoral may refer to:

- English Pastoral (book), a 2020 nonfiction book by James Rebanks
- English Pastoral School, a group of 20th-century classical composers
