= Hertha Klust =

German woman classical pianist

External audio
- Shellac recordings with Hertha Klust in the Online Archive of the Österreichische Mediathek

Hertha Klust (1907 – March 1970) was a German pianist.

== Career ==
Born in Berlin, Klust, who had trained as a singer (mezzo-soprano), worked from 1949, despite increasing hearing loss, as a répétiteur at the Deutsche Oper Berlin, where she musically formed a number of later important singers, including Pilar Lorengar. In the concert hall, she made a name for herself above all as a song accompanist. Besides Ernst Haefliger and Josef Greindl, she accompanied the young Dietrich Fischer-Dieskau, which is documented by numerous radio and vinyl recordings of the 1950s. The joint concert activity with Fischer-Dieskau began as early as July 1948 in the Berlin Titania-Palast with a rendition of Schubert's Die schöne Müllerin and continued into the late 1950s.

In 1954 Klust was presented the Berliner Kunstpreis.

== Discography ==
Recordings with Dietrich Fischer-Dieskau:

- Johannes Brahms: Vier ernste Gesänge (1949)
- Gustav Mahler: 3 Lieder from Des Knaben Wunderhorn (1952)
- Johannes Brahms: Die schöne Magelone (1953)
- Franz Schubert: Die Winterreise (Konzertmitschnitt 1953)
- Robert Schumann: Liederkreis, op. 35 (Konzertmitschnitt 1954)
- Ludwig van Beethoven: Sechs Lieder von Gellert, op. 48 und 7 Lieder von Goethe (1955)
- Robert Schumann: Liederkreis, op. 24 and Der arme Peter op. 53,3 (1956)
- Hugo Wolf: Lieder from the Italienisches Liederbuch, aus den Goethe-Liedern, aus den Mörike-Liedern (1948 - 53)

Recording with Ernst Haefliger:

- Liederabend (Lieder by Schumann, Schoeck, Kodály and Wolf, 1958)

Recordings with Josef Greindl:

- Carl Loewe: Balladen (1951)
- Franz Schubert: Die Winterreise (1957)
