= Pilar Lorengar =

Spanish opera singer

- Born: Lorenza Pilar García Seta; 16 January 1928; Zaragoza, Kingdom of Spain
- Died: 2 June 1996 (aged 68); Berlin, Germany
- Occupation: Soprano singer
- Years active: 1949–1991
- Organization: Deutsche Oper Berlin
- Title: Kammersängerin
- Spouse: Jürgen Schaff
- Awards: Order of Merit of Berlin, Prince of Asturias Award for the Arts (1991)

Lorenza Pilar García Seta (16 January 1928 – 2 June 1996), known professionally as Pilar Lorengar, was a Spanish (Aragonese) soprano. She was best known for her interpretations of opera and the Spanish genre zarzuela, and she was known for her full register and youthful timbre as well as a distinctive vibrato.

== Early career ==
Lorengar was born in the El Gancho district of Zaragoza. At a very young age she participated in a Radio Zaragoza program called Ondas Infantiles; she began formal music lessons at the age of fourteen under Margarita Martínez. She moved to Barcelona to study at the Barcelona Music Conservatory and began performing incognito under the name Loren Arce in various halls in order to pay for her lessons. She later studied in Madrid under Spanish lyric soprano Ángeles Otein, and in West Berlin with Carl Ebert and pianist Hertha Klust, Dietrich Fischer-Dieskau's teacher.

Lorengar became a member of the chorus of the Teatro de la Zarzuela around 1949. She made her professional debut in 1950 in Oran, Algeria, playing the role of Maruxa. In 1951 she made her Spanish debut in the principal role in the zarzuela El canastillo de fresas (The Strawberry Basket). In 1952, she performed as a soloist in Barcelona in Beethoven's Ninth Symphony and in Brahms's German Requiem.

== International career ==
Her international opera career started in 1955 at the Festival international d'Art Lyrique in Aix-en-Provence, where she played Cherubino in The Marriage of Figaro. She went on to play in London, Glyndebourne and Buenos Aires. In 1958 she signed a contract with the Deutsche Oper Berlin, beginning a relationship that lasted thirty years. Her first performance for the Deutsche Oper took place a few months later, in 1959. In 1963 she was distinguished with the title of Kammersängerin by the Senate of Berlin.

In 1961, she first performed at the Salzburg Festival as Ilia in Idomeneo. She went on to play Desdemona in Otello at the San Francisco Opera, Violetta in La traviata at the Deutsche Oper in Berlin, and Donna Elvira in Don Giovanni at the Metropolitan Opera. During her career she also performed frequently with the Vienna Philharmonic and the Vienna State Opera, as well as in Madrid, Brussels, La Scala at Milan, Liceu at Barcelona, and in Paris and Tokyo.

Her 1985 zarzuela duet album with Plácido Domingo at the Salzburg Music Festival brought her again to the forefront of zarzuela, and both Lorengar and Domingo were nominated for the Grammy Award for Best Classical Vocal Solo. Her final performance at the Deutsche Oper Berlin was as Valentine in Les Huguenots in 1987.

== Later life ==
In 1991, the Príncipe de Asturias Foundation awarded the "Generation of Spanish lyric singers" (de los Ángeles, Berganza, Caballé, Carreras, Domingo, Kraus and Lorengar) the Arts award. Lorengar announced her retirement and performed her last concert at the Campoamor Theatre in Oviedo (Asturias), Spain. In 1994, she was awarded the Order of Merit of Berlin.

Pilar Lorengar died of cancer in Berlin, scene of her longest artistic associations, where she resided with her husband, dentist Jürgen Schaff. A free public vocational high school for the media arts in her city of birth, Zaragoza, Spain, was named I.E.S. Pilar Lorengar in her honor.

== Recordings ==
She can be seen in black-and-white videos from the Deutsche Oper (in German) of Don Giovanni (as Donna Elvira) and Don Carlos (as Elizabeth). In both of these performances, she shares the stage with Dietrich Fischer-Dieskau and Josef Greindl.
