= Summer Night on the River =

Tone poem composed by Frederick Delius

Orchestral score: opening bars

Summer Night on the River is a tone poem composed in 1911 by Frederick Delius. Together with On Hearing the First Cuckoo in Spring it is one of Delius's Two Pieces for Small Orchestra. The two were first performed in Leipzig on 23 October 1913, conducted by Arthur Nikisch.

== Background and first performance ==
In the first years of the 20th century Frederick Delius was better known in Continental Europe than in his native Britain. He lived in France and had most of his musical success in Germany. His compositions from this period include Songs of Sunset (1906–07), Brigg Fair (1907) and In a Summer Garden (1908). He completed the first of his Two Pieces for Small Orchestra – Summer Night on the River – in 1911, and worked on the second, On Hearing the First Cuckoo in Spring, during 1912.

The two works were first given in Leipzig by the Gewandhaus Orchestra conducted by Arthur Nikisch on 23 October 1913. Although completed first, Summer Night on the River is designated the second of the two, which were billed as "Stimmungsbilder" – "mood-pictures" – with the titles "Beim ersten Kuckucksruf im Frühling" and "Sommernacht am Flusse". The first performance in Britain was presented by the Royal Philharmonic Society at a Queen's Hall concert on 20 January 1914, conducted by Willem Mengelberg.

== Music ==
The piece is scored for two flutes, one oboe, two clarinets in B♭, two bassoons, two horns in F and strings. It opens pianissimo in G major in 12/8 After the eighth bar the key changes to C major, and remains there for the rest of the piece; the time is predominantly 6/4 with short fluctuations in 6/8, 9/8, 3/4 and 4/4.

The orchestral score of the Two Pieces for Small Orchestra was published by Tischer & Jagenburg of Cologne in 1914, with a dedication to the composer and musical benefactor Balfour Gardiner. In 1930 the Oxford University Press published the score. The manuscript is lost.

Gerard Bunk arranged a version for solo piano in 1914; Peter Warlock made a version for piano duo in 1930.

== References and sources ==
=== Sources ===
- Beecham, Sir Thomas (1975) [1959]. Frederick Delius (second ed.). London: Severn House. ISBN 978-0-7278-0073-2.
- Delius, Frederick (1997). "Summer Night on the River". Brigg Fair and Other Favorite Orchestral Works in Full Score (PDF). Mineola: Dover. pp. 137–143. ISBN 978-0-486-29851-1.
- Threlfall, Robert (1977). A Catalogue of the Compositions of Frederick Delius: Sources and References. London: Delius Trust. ISBN 978-0-85162-028-2.
