= Irmelin =

Opera in three acts

Frederick Delius, photographed in 1907

Irmelin is an opera in three acts with music by Frederick Delius. Composed between 1890 and 1892, it was his first opera and went unperformed until 1953, nearly twenty years after his death. The libretto was by the composer and weaves together folklore stories. In 1931 Delius made a new Irmelin prelude, using themes from the opera, and this has entered the concert and recording repertoire.

In the opera the heroine, Princess Irmelin, sits in her castle waiting for the dream lover promised to her by voices in the air. She infuriates her father the King by rejecting all her knightly suitors. Meanwhile, Nils, a prince enslaved as a swineherd by the robber chief Rolf, breaks free and finds his way to Irmelin just after her enforced betrothal to one of the suitors. The opera ends with the lovers disappearing together into the forest.

== Background ==
In the early 1890s, after studying at the Leipzig Conservatory, Delius moved to Paris. He quickly became a member of an artistic circle that included well-known painters such as Paul Gauguin and Edvard Munch, but the Parisian musical scene seemed closed to him. (Note: Although Delius lived in France for most of the rest of his life, his music never became popular there, his successes being in Germany and then Britain.) He went to Lamoureux concerts and the Opéra, developing the love of opera he had first conceived in his Leipzig days. According to his biographer and champion Sir Thomas Beecham, "Throughout the first two years of his residence in and around Paris he was obsessed with the ambition to write an opera on some grand historical subject". His musical friends included Edvard Grieg and Christian Sinding; the latter had been encouraging him for several years to make the attempt. Irmelin, which he began in 1890, calling it a "Lyric Drama", was the result. Emulating Wagner, whom he admired, Delius wrote his own libretto. He decided on a fairy-tale plot, drawing on several existing literary sources. Beecham later maintained that the stories were "Northern and early medieval", but subsequent research suggests that the main source was "Irmelin Rose", a poem by the 19th-century writer Jens Peter Jacobsen. Delius had assimilated Wagnerian influence in his music, with the use of leitmotifs and a sense of flow through the three acts.

According to the composer Peter Warlock (a disciple of Delius), although Grieg and Messager admired the score, its composer "never seriously contemplated" a production of the opera, but the musical scholar Jeremy Dibble writes that in the hope of a German production Delius travelled to Bayreuth to show the score to the Wagner conductor Hermann Levi. Levi recommended a meeting with Richard Strauss, who was then Kapellmeister in Munich, but no further progress was made.

== Performance history ==
Beecham conducted the world premiere at the New Theatre Oxford on 4 May 1953; the costumes were by Beatrice Dawson and choreography by Pauline Grant. Beecham's advocacy of the score and the "care with which he realizes each detail, the beauty of sound he elicits from his orchestra", were praised by the Opera critic, as was Dennis Arundell's production.

Florent Schmitt arranged the piano scores of Delius's first two operas, Irmelin and The Magic Fountain, but the first full Irmelin score was a vocal score compiled by Dennis Arundell in 1953.

Delius returned to the score in his last years. In late 1931, with the aid of his amanuensis, Eric Fenby, he created a new Irmelin prelude, described by Dibble as "a miniature ternary structure ... in F sharp major", using material from the original prelude, the conclusion to Act I and themes from Act III. Beecham premiered it as an interlude in Act III of the revival of Delius's Koanga at Covent Garden in September 1935; its first concert performance was in April 1937 when Beecham conducted it at the Queen's Hall. He later arranged an orchestral suite from the music for the second act. Beecham owned the manuscript score of the opera, given to him by the composer, which in 1982, was handed on to the Delius Trust.

== Roles ==
| Role | Voice type | Premiere cast, 4 May 1953 Oxford University Opera Club, Royal Philharmonic Orchestra, Sir Thomas Beecham |
|---|---|---|
| Irmelin, a princess | soprano | Edna Graham |
| The King, her father | bass | Arthur Copley |
| Nils, a prince having lost his way, swineherd of Rolf | tenor | Thomas Round |
| Rolf, a chief of robbers | baritone | George Hancock |
| Old knight | baritone | David Oddie |
| Young knight | tenor | Robert Edy |
| Warlike knight | bass | |
| Maid | mezzo-soprano | Claire Duchesneau |
| The voice in the air | soprano | |
| A woman | mezzo-soprano | |
Chorus of robbers, knights, women, wood nymphs, girls and boys

== Synopsis ==
=== Act 1 ===
Irmelin's room in the royal castle: A voice in the air counsels the Princess Irmelin on the man she should fall in love with. The king introduces – and she refuses – three suitors: one old, but rich and devoted, another young and handsome, and the third middle-aged, rich but disagreeable (to whom she is compulsorily betrothed in Act 3).

=== Act 2 ===
Scene 1 – a forest swamp: Nils is in despair since he lost the Silver Stream which would lead him to his dream princess. Rolf, a robber chief, calls him to his stronghold and makes him a swineherd. There is a storm.

Scene 2 – a hall in the stronghold of Rolf: We meet Rolf's followers, men and women carousing and Rolf declares that he will woo the princess. Nils refuses to sing for the assembly as he wants to quest for the Silver Stream.

Scene 3 – in the mountains: As Nils comes to the Silver Stream, wood-nymphs entice him but he resolutely continues his way.

=== Act 3 ===
Scene 1 – a hall in the castle: Six months later, as the deadline set by the king for her to marry approaches, Irmelin still hopes that her prince will arrive. Nils enters but when he sings of his life as a swineherd he is dismissed to the servants' hall. By night he returns to Irmelin's balcony and they declare their love.

Scene 2 – outside the castle: They wander off to the forest as the castle vanishes.

== Reputation ==
Beecham's view of Irmelin was: "Taking the work as a whole I have little hesitation in claiming for it the distinction of being the best first opera written by any composer known to me". Warlock described the opera as a "fairy-tale of quite ordinary kind" and "its form dramatically rather below the level of the conventional operatic text". In Grove's Dictionary of Music and Musicians, Robert Anderson says of the text, "The libretto's undoubted charm is somewhat obscured by its naivety and the banality of Delius's attempts at rhyme", but he is more complimentary about the score, with its "telling use of motifs that are memorable and apt, economy in the setting of atmosphere, and ability to fill convincingly the large span of the three acts with an admirable sense of flow". The critic Winton Dean wrote of the piece:

The harmony is often quite characteristic, except that it moves at least twice as slowly as in his mature work. His besetting fault is already in evidence: whatever the tempo marking, the pulse of the music is consistently sluggish. However lovingly linked the cadences, however sleek the scoring, this makes for monotony and at the last for slumber. But the dreams will be euphonious and soothing.

== Recording ==
There is (2024) one complete recording of Irmelin:

- BBC Artium (1985): Eilene Hannan (Irmelin), Ann Howard (Maid), John Mitchinson (Nils), Michael Rippon (King), Brian Rayner Cook (Rolf); BBC Singers and Concert Orchestra conducted by Norman Del Mar. Recording from a broadcast on BBC Radio 3, 18 December 1984.

The Irmelin Prelude (from 1931) has been recorded by, among others:

- National Symphony Orchestra (UK), Sidney Beer (1944)
- Royal Philharmonic Orchestra, Sir Thomas Beecham (1946)
- Cleveland Orchestra, George Szell (1957)
- Hallé Orchestra, Sir John Barbirolli (1957)
- London Symphony Orchestra, Barbirolli (1966)
- BBC Concert Orchestra, Ashley Lawrence (1974)
- Bournemouth Sinfonietta, Norman Del Mar (1977)
- London Philharmonic Orchestra, Vernon Handley (1979)
- Welsh National Opera Orchestra, Sir Charles Mackerras (1992)
- New Zealand Symphony Orchestra, Myer Fredman (1995)

== Notes, references and sources ==
=== Sources ===
- Beecham, Thomas (1975) [1959]. Frederick Delius. Sutton: Severn House. ISBN 0-7278-0099-X.
- Dibble, Jeremy (2021). The Music of Frederick Delius. Woodbridge: Boydell Press. ISBN 978-1-78-744799-8.
- Warlock, Peter (1923). Frederick Delius. London: John Lane. OCLC 1114098833.
