= Maureen Guy =

Welsh opera singer (1932–2015)

- Born: Ruth Maureen Guy; 10 July 1932; Penclawdd, Wales
- Died: 14 February 2015 (aged 82); Haverfordwest, Wales
- Education: Guildhall School of Music and Drama
- Occupation: Singer
- Years active: 1950s–1998
- Spouse: John Mitchinson (m. 1958; died 2015)
- Children: 2

Ruth Maureen Guy (10 July 1932 – 14 February 2015) was a Welsh mezzo-soprano singer. The youngest of six children of a coal miner, she was influenced by church music in her youth. Guy's debut came at Sadler's Wells Theatre and several of her early engagements were with the London Mozart Players. She became principal mezzo at the Royal Opera House in 1963 and made the first of several appearance at The Proms that same year. In 1969, Guy was selected as one of fifteen soloists to sing at the Investiture of the Prince of Wales and later joined the Opern- und Schauspielhaus Frankfurt in 1972. She took up a teaching position with the Royal Welsh College of Music & Drama which she retired from in 1998 to teach privately at her home in Sageston.

== Early life and education ==
She was born Ruth Maureen Guy on 10 July 1932 in the Welsh village of Penclawdd, west of Swansea. She was the youngest of six children of a coal miner, who died while Guy was in her early childhood. Guy attended school in the nearby village of Gowerton. She became influenced in music with church music performed at the nearby Bethel chapel and sang at the National Eisteddfod. At the age of 18, she won a Glamoran Scholarship to study at the Guildhall School of Music and Drama. While at the school, she earned praise from The Times's music critic for her account of the aria "Inflammatus" from Antonín Dvořák's orchestra Stabat Mater in December 1954. Guy focused on her studies, and made the finals of the 1955 Kathleen Ferrier Award. She earned second prize in the competition, and Garry Humphreys of The Independent wrote that her "rich and expressive contralto" gained respect. Guy was awarded the Mary Cantell Oratorio Scholarship, the Hendon Music Prize and the triannual Worshipful Company of Musicians Silver Cup. She graduated in 1957.

== Career ==
Guy made her debut as a mezzo-soprano singer at Sadler's Wells Theatre as Dryade in Ariadne auf Naxos. She gave a recital at London's Wigmore Hall, where she sang arias by George Friedrich Händel and Gaetano Donizett in 1957. Guy received praise for her performance and one critic noted "the assurance with which [she] projected her resonant contralto tone … was irresistible". The following March, she married the tenor John Mitchinson at Bethel Chapel, Penclawdd. Several of Guy's early engagements were with the London Mozart Players under their founder and conductor Harry Blech. She also made appearances on British television. One such concert was the one to mark the 150th anniversary of Joseph Haydn's death at the Royal Festival Hall in May 1959. In 1960, she sang in Schubert's Mass with the same orchestra. She participated in a concert to commemorate astronaut Yuri Gagarin's achievement of being the first human to go into space the following year.

By the early 1960s Guy featured regularly as a soloist in London and became principal mezzo at the Royal Opera House in 1963. That same year, she played Flosshilde in Hans Hotter's production of Götterdämmerung at Covent Garden with fellow sopranos Rita Hunter and Birgit Nilsson and conducted by Georg Solti. This was followed by Deliah in Samson and Deliah by Camille Saint-Saëns at Sadler's Wells Theatre. Guy's performances came under criticism for her limited range of vocal colour in her characterisation. Her first appearance at The Proms came in the same year in the Richard Wagner 150th anniversary concert under Solti. Guy appeared at the Proms two years later in Arnold Schoenberg's Moses und Aron with Solti performing, and the following year, performed in Parsifal. She sang overseas by travelling across Europe and to Australia and New Zealand. In 1965, she was a replacement actor for the role of Azucena in Il trovatore.

Guy appeared in Igor Stravinsky's Oedipus rex in 1966 in the Odeon of Herodes Atticus and was conducted by the composer himself, and two years later appeared in the Malcolm Sargent memorial concert with Colin Davis conducting at the First Night of the Proms. She was chosen as one of fifteen soloists to perform at the Investiture of the Prince of Wales at Caernarfon Castle on 1 July 1969. In 1971, Guy sang at the 80th birthday concert for Stravinsky. Guy joined the Opern- und Schauspielhaus Frankfurt in 1972 and five years later acted as the Countess in the Welsh National Opera's performance of The Queen of Spades with David Lloyd-Jones serving as conductor. She and her husband Mitchinson frequently performed at the Three Choirs Festival, where she played the Angel in Edward Elgar's The Dream of Gerontius in 1977 at Gloucester. Guy also maintained close connections with the Philomusica, the West Country choir.

== Later life and death ==
After retiring from her teaching position at the Royal Welsh College of Music & Drama in 1998, Guy began teaching privately at her home in Sageston, Pembrokeshire until a few weeks before her death. She died on 14 February 2015 in Haverfordwest and was survived by her husband and two sons. Guy was given a funeral service at Carew Wesley Methodist Chapel and later a memorial service at Parc Gwyn Crematorium.
