= Claudia Lindsey =

American operatic soprano (born 1936)

Claudia Lindsey (born 1936 or 1937) is an American operatic soprano.

Born in Harlem, she is a graduate of Brandeis University and studied singing in New York City with Anna Hamlin and Otto Guth. In 1965 she won the Metropolitan Opera National Council Auditions and a grant from the John Hay Whitney Foundation. That same year she made her professional opera debut with the New York City Opera as Clara in George Gershwin's Porgy and Bess.

In 1969 Lindsey made her debut at the San Francisco Opera as Bianca in Giacomo Puccini's La rondine. She was also heard in San Francisco that year as Anna Gomez in Gian Carlo Menotti's The Consul. In 1970 she sang the role of Palmyra in the United States premiere of Frederick Delius' Koanga with the Opera Society of Washington. She also sang the work in London two years later at the Camden Festival where she recorded the opera with the London Symphony Orchestra. In 1972 she performed Saint Teresa in Virgil Thomson's Four Saints in Three Acts at the American Shakespeare Theatre. In 1979 she was a soloist in the premiere of George Walker's Mass with the Baltimore Symphony Orchestra.

Finding it difficult to get work with opera companies in the United States, Lindsey went to Europe where she portrayed such roles as Countess Almaviva in The Marriage of Figaro, the Female Chorus in The Rape of Lucretia, Fiordiligi in Così fan tutte, Mimì in La bohème, and the title heroine in Aida among other parts during the 1970s. In 1978 she portrayed the title role in Puccini's Tosca with the Opera Company of Boston with Sarah Caldwell conducting. She recorded the role of Bess to the Porgy of Benjamin Matthews with the Slovak Philharmonic in 1980, an album of selections from the opera only.
