= Vier ernste Gesänge =

Final song cycle composed by Johannes Brahms

- Song cycle by Johannes Brahms
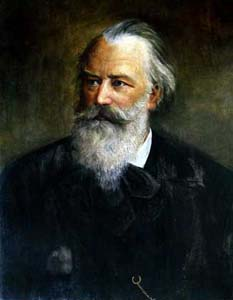
- Brahms, posthumous portrait adapted from a photograph
- English: Four Serious Songs
- Opus: 121
- Text: Bible
- Language: German
- Composed: 1896
- Dedication: Max Klinger
- Performed: 9 November 1896: Vienna
- Movements: 4
- Scoring: Voice (baritone or alto) and piano

Vier ernste Gesänge ('Four Serious Songs'), Op. 121, is a cycle of four songs for bass and piano by Johannes Brahms. As in his Ein deutsches Requiem, the texts are compiled from the Luther Bible. Three songs deal with death and the transience of life, while the fourth has an outlook of faith, hope and charity. Brahms composed the work in Vienna in 1896 and dedicated it to Max Klinger. The songs were premiered there in the presence of the composer by baritone Anton Sistermans and pianist Coenraad V. Bos. They have been recorded often by both female and male singers.

The text adapts passages from the Ecclesiastes, the Book of Sirach, and the First Epistle to the Corinthians.

== History ==
Between 1865 and 1868, as a young man, Brahms had composed Ein deutsches Requiem (A German Requiem), dealing with death, based on a compilation of biblical quotations in Luther's translation. He wrote Vier ernste Gesänge late in life, again on words from the Bible. His friend Clara Schumann had suffered a stroke on 26 March 1896. Brahms completed the composition of this set of songs, his last, by his birthday on 7 May that year, in anticipation of her death.

== Sources ==
The texts of the first three songs are taken from the Old Testament and deal with death, the transience of life and oppression. The text of the fourth song is taken from the New Testament and is focused on faith, hope and charity.

The original titles:

1. Denn es gehet dem Menschen wie dem Vieh (Prediger Salomo, Kap. 3)
2. Ich wandte mich, und sahe an (Prediger Salomo, Kap. 4)
3. O Tod, wie bitter bist du (Jesus Sirach, Kap. 41)
4. Wenn ich mit Menschen- und mit Engelszungen (S. Pauli an die Corinther I., Kap. 13)

The Bible sources:

1. Denn es gehet dem Menschen (It is for a person as it is for an animal) from Ecclesiastes (3:19–22)
2. Ich wandte mich, und sahe an (I turned and looked upon everyone) from Ecclesiastes (4:1–3)
3. O Tod, wie bitter bist du (O death, how bitter you are) from the Book of Sirach (41:1–2)
4. Wenn ich mit Menschen (If I speak with the tongues of humans and angels) from First Epistle to the Corinthians (13:1–3,12–13)

The songs were published by Simrock in 1896. Brahms dedicated them to Max Klinger. Written for a low voice, they were also transcribed for high voice. They have been orchestrated by Detlev Glanert (whose orchestration adds linking preludes) and Günter Raphael. In 2013 British composer David Matthews arranged the cycle for baritone and strings.

== Premiere ==
Advertisement for the premiere at Bösendorfer-Saal

The first performance was given in Vienna on 9 November 1896 in the presence of the composer, by two Dutch artists: the baritone Anton Sistermans and the 20-year-old pianist Coenraad V. Bos. Brahms came backstage and thanked Sistermans and Bos for the performance, which he said "perfectly realised [his] intentions".

Two weeks later, Bos accompanied Raimund von zur-Mühlen in the four songs. Zur-Mühlen could not achieve the final diminuendo as marked in the score, so he instructed Bos to continue the crescendo after the vocal line finished and end the work fff rather than the p that Brahms had indicated. Later, zur-Mühlen spoke to Brahms and said he hoped he didn't mind this diversion from the score. Brahms replied "You sang them magnificently. I did not notice anything wrong".

== Structure ==
In the following table, the key is that of the original composition, marking and time are also given. The links to separate scores provide the version for high voice.

No.	Beginning of text	Marking	Key	Time	Score	Analysis
1	Denn es gehet dem Menschen	Andante	D minor	4/4		Analysis of song 1
2	Ich wandte mich, und sahe an	Andante	G minor	3/4		Analysis of song 2
3	O Tod, wie bitter bist du	Grave	E minor	3/2		Analysis of song 3
4	Wenn ich mit Menschen	Andante con moto et anima	E♭ major	4/4		Analysis of song 4

== Recordings ==
Kathleen Ferrier recorded Vier ernste Gesänge in 1947 with pianist Phyllis Spurr, and in 1950 with John Newmark. A reviewer commented in Gramophone:

The vocal line spans nearly two octaves, some of it lying rather awkwardly for the voice, but Miss Ferrier meets all its demands triumphantly—and nowhere more so than in the wonderful third song, O Tod, wie bitter bist du, in which she beautifully covers the top notes, and in the last song, in which she gives such noble expression, with full voice, to the great phrase set to the words 'Nun aber bleibet glaube, hoffnung, liebe, diese drei' ('Now abideth faith and hope and love, these three'). Here, then, we have a major achievement of the singer's art, a definitive performance of great songs.

In a 1949 live broadcast from the Royal Albert Hall, she sang an orchestrated version in English with the BBC Symphony Orchestra, conducted by Malcolm Sargent.

Hans Hotter recorded the songs in 1951 with pianist Gerald Moore, along with other songs by Brahms and the Bach cantata BWV 82:

In the grim opening song, the music's funereal sideways steps are broken by a stormy section in which we're reminded that Hotter was the reigning Wotan of the past half-century. He brings an appropriately sepulchral tone to the second song, where at times the huge voice is scaled down to a whisper, an effect that's sparingly used but (as done here) can make strong hearts melt. In the third song Hotter infuses his voice with bitterness, and in the last offers consoling comfort. A great performance.

Dietrich Fischer-Dieskau recorded the songs several times, beginning in 1949 in his first recording with Deutsche Grammophon, accompanied by Hertha Klust. Anne Ozorio described it as "another seminal moment in song history. The singer had barely turned 24 but already captured the profundity of Brahms’ meditation on death". He recorded them with Daniel Barenboim in March 1972 (449 633–2) and again with Jörg Demus. Christian Gerhaher and pianist Gerold Huber recorded the songs in 2002.

Helen Traubel recorded the songs in 1949 with pianist Coenraad V. Bos.

Teddy Tahu Rhodes recorded the Glanert orchestration on his album Serious Songs in 2011 with the Tasmanian Symphony Orchestra under Sebastian Lang-Lessing for ABC Classics.

On his CD, "Encounter" (2020), Igor Levit performs Vier ernste Gesänge arranged for piano by Max Reger.
