= On Hearing the First Cuckoo in Spring =

Symphonic poem by Frederick Delius

Orchestral score: opening bars

Song of the common cuckoo

On Hearing the First Cuckoo in Spring is a tone poem composed in 1912 by Frederick Delius. Together with Summer Night on the River it is one of Delius's Two Pieces for Small Orchestra. The two were first performed in Leipzig on 23 October 1913, conducted by Arthur Nikisch. On Hearing the First Cuckoo in Spring is the longer of the two pieces, with a typical playing time of between six and seven minutes. There have been numerous recordings of the piece, which Delius's champion Sir Thomas Beecham described as much the best known of the composer's works.

== Background and first performance ==
In the first years of the 20th century, Frederick Delius was better known in Continental Europe than in his native Britain. He lived in France and had most of his musical success in Germany. His compositions from this period include Songs of Sunset (1906–07), Brigg Fair (1907) and In a Summer Garden (1908). He completed the first of his Two Pieces for Small Orchestra – Summer Night on the River – in 1911, and worked on the second, On Hearing the First Cuckoo in Spring during 1912.

The two works were first given in Leipzig by the Gewandhaus Orchestra conducted by Arthur Nikisch on 23 October 1913. Although completed second, On Hearing the First Cuckoo in Spring is designated the first of the two, which were billed as "Stimmungsbilder" – "mood-pictures" – with the titles "Beim ersten Kuckucksruf im Frühling" and "Sommernacht am Flusse". The first performance in Britain was presented by the Royal Philharmonic Society at a Queen's Hall concert on 20 January 1914, conducted by Willem Mengelberg.

== Publication and arrangements ==
The score is dedicated to the composer and musical benefactor Balfour Gardiner. It was first published by Tischer & Jagenburg of Cologne in 1914. In 1930 the Oxford University Press published the score. The full title of the piece in the published score is On Hearing the First Cuckoo in Spring (Introducing a Norwegian Folk Song). The manuscript is lost, but a draft version survives, held by the Grainger Museum, Melbourne.

There have been numerous arrangements of the piece. Gerard Bunk arranged a version for solo piano in 1914, Peter Warlock made a version for piano duo in 1930, Eric Fenby arranged it for organ in 1934 and Rudolf Schmidt-Wunstorf made a version for two pianos in 1952. There are also versions for wind band (1969) and brass band (1976).

== Music ==
The playing time of the piece is typically between six and seven minutes, although a few recorded performances are quicker or slower than this. (Note: Two recordings released in 2004 are at the extremes of duration: one conducted by David Lloyd-Jones takes 5m 53s, and that conducted by Georg Tintner takes 7m 53s.) The piece opens in C major in 6/4 with a slow three-bar sequence. The main theme, marked "With easy flowing movement", is an exchange of cuckoo calls, first for oboe, then for divided strings. The second theme is scored for first violins, and is taken from a Norwegian folksong, "In Ola Valley", which was brought to Delius's attention by the composer and folksong arranger Percy Grainger. The theme had earlier been used by Edvard Grieg in the 14th of his 19 Norwegian Folksongs, Op. 66. Grainger compared the two treatments: "Grieg's is concentrated, pristine, miniature and drastic … Delius's has the opulent richness of an almost over-ripe fruit and the luxurious long decline of a sunset". The clarinet returns with the cuckoo calls before the piece ends quietly.

== Critical reception ==
Sir Thomas Beecham, Delius's most prominent British champion, called On Hearing the First Cuckoo in Spring "easily the best known of all our composer's output". Beecham said of this piece and the companion Summer Night on the River: "In their respective ways they touch perfection, although I cannot agree with the judgment of one commentator that they display Frederick's powers of orchestration at their best. After all they are miniatures and written primarily for small groups of players".

Commentators have differed about whether the pastoral scene is an English one. In a 1973 study Lionel Carley wrote that the music gives "an instinctive feeling that, wherever the inspiration may be rooted, an essentially English natural setting is being evoked". In 2004 Diana McVeagh wrote of the Delius miniatures, "These exquisite idylls, for all their composer's German descent and French domicile, spell 'England' for most listeners". In 2018 Daniel Grimley suggested "the music's 'place' is really Norway/Germany as much as the English countryside".

Christopher Palmer followed Grainger in comparing Delius's and Grieg's treatment of the folk tune:

The First Cuckoo is no modest essay in folk-song-like ingenuous freshness; on the contrary it is considerably sophisticated. The "Ola Valley" theme is interwoven with another (uncredited but noticeably redolent of the "Student’s Serenade" in [Grieg's] Moods, Op. 73) which appears at the beginning and in a short element of recapitulation and conditions the rhythmic substance and general atmosphere of the piece.

Palmer comments that unlike Grieg, Delius treats the tune very freely, creating "a gently persistent liquefaction of harmony".

== Discography ==
Orchestra	Conductor	First issued
London Philharmonic	Sir Thomas Beecham	1927
London Symphony	Geoffrey Toye	1928
London Philharmonic	Constant Lambert	1940
National Symphony	Walter Goehr	1948
Liverpool Philharmonic	Sir Malcolm Sargent	1947
London Symphony	Anthony Collins	1953
Concert Arts	Felix Slatkin	1954
Royal Philharmonic	Sir Thomas Beecham	1958
Philadelphia	Eugene Ormandy	1962
Hallé	Sir John Barbirolli	1969
English Chamber	Daniel Barenboim	1973
Orchestra da camera di Roma	Nicolas Flagello	1977
Bournemouth Sinfonietta	Norman Del Mar	1977
Academy of St Martin in the Fields	Neville Marriner	1979
London Philharmonic	Vernon Handley	1984
English Sinfonia	Sir Charles Groves	1989
London Symphony	Barry Wordsworth	1991
Welsh National Opera	Sir Charles Mackerras	1992
Royal Scottish National	David Lloyd-Jones	2004
Symphony Nova Scotia	Georg Tintner	2004
Hallé	Sir Mark Elder	2007
Grimethorpe Colliery Band	Elgar Howarth	2007
Orchestra della Svizzera Italiana	Howard Griffiths	2013
San Francisco Symphony	Michael Tilson Thomas	2014
Bergen Philharmonic Orchestra	Sir Andrew Davis	2014

Some of the conductors listed above, notably Beecham, recorded several other versions of the piece, either in the studio or in live concert recordings.

Source: WorldCat and Naxos Music Library

== Notes, references and sources ==
=== Sources ===
- Beecham, Sir Thomas (1975) [1959]. Frederick Delius (second ed.). London: Severn House. ISBN 978-0-7278-0073-2.
- Delius, Frederick (1997). "On Hearing the First Cuckoo in Spring". Brigg Fair and Other Favorite Orchestral Works in Full Score (PDF). Mineola: Dover. pp. 131–136. ISBN 978-0-486-29851-1.
- Grimley, Daniel (2018). Delius and the Sound of Place. Cambridge and New York: Cambridge University Press. ISBN 978-1-108-47039-1.
- Heseltine, Philip (1952) [1923]. Frederick Delius (second ed.). London: Bodley Head. OCLC 873175571.
- Palmer, Christopher (1976). Delius: Portrait of a Cosmopolitan. London: Duckworth. ISBN 978-0-7156-0773-2.
- Threlfall, Robert (1977). A Catalogue of the Compositions of Frederick Delius: Sources and References. London: Delius Trust. ISBN 978-0-85162-028-2.
