= The Magic Fountain (opera) =

Opera by Frederick Delius

The Magic Fountain is a three-act lyric drama, the second opera by the English composer Frederick Delius. The libretto by the composer was inspired by the legend of the fountain of eternal youth recounted by Juan Ponce de León, and the work is set in Florida and the Everglades (where Delius lived from 1884 to 1886) at the time of the Spanish conquest.

Delius began writing The Magic Fountain in 1893; completed in 1895, the premiere was a BBC radio studio broadcast from 1977 and the stage premiere took place in June 1997 in Kiel, the last of Delius's operas to reach the stage. In early drafts the tenor role was called Ponce, but Delius changed it to Solano, the name of his plantation.

Materials in the archive of the Delius Trust suggest that the composer tried unsuccessfully to interest opera companies in central Europe to mount the work, but due to the self-borrowings for Koanga and other works he abandoned those attempts. The opera uses musical elements from the Florida Suite and the leitmotif for Watawa occurs in Sea Drift.

== Performance history ==
After the BBC broadcast and the staged production in Germany, it was seen at the Theatre Royal, Glasgow, on 20 February 1999, produced for Scottish Opera by Aidan Lang, with Stephen Allen, Anne Mason, Jonathan Veira and Stafford Dean, conducted by Richard Armstrong. The Wexford Festival in 2025 included stage performances, conducted by Francesco Cilluffo with Axelle Saint-Cirel and Dominick Valdéz-Chenez leading the cast.

== Roles ==
| Role | Voice type | Premiere cast (BBC radio), broadcast 20 November 1977 (Conductor: Norman Del Mar) | Premiere cast (stage, Kiel), 22 June 1997 (Conductor: Walter Gugerbauer) |
|---|---|---|---|
| Solano, a Spanish nobleman | tenor | John Mitchinson | Karsten Russ |
| Watawa, a young Indian girl | soprano | Katherine Pring | Monika Teepe |
| Wapanacki, an Indian chief | bass | Norman Welsby | Sarni Luttinen |
| Talum Hadjo, a seer | bass | Richard Angas | Hans Georg Ahrens |
| A Spanish sailor | bass | Francis Thomas | |
Sailors, Indian warriors, Indian women, Night mists, Invisible spirits of the fountain

== Synopsis ==
Place: America - Act 1 is set on board a ship then on a beach in Florida; Act 2 is set in an Indian village in the forest, then at Talum Hadjo's home by the banks of a stream; and Act 3 in the Everglades "a tropical and luxurious swamp"
Time: 16th century

Solano seeks the Fountain of Eternal Youth and Life and his ship is wrecked on the coast of Florida. The only survivor, he travels into the forest and with the help of an Indian Princess, whose family have been killed by the Spanish invaders, and finds the fountain. She is aware that for some its waters will just bring death - but after falling in love with Solano, despite her hatred of the white man, she too drinks the water.

== Recordings ==
As the premiere BBC broadcast, recorded at the Golders Green Hippodrome on 30 July 1977, with the BBC Concert Orchestra and BBC Singers, vocal coach Giles Swayne, produced by Elaine Padmore. BBC Artium, 1980, 2-LP set.
