= Gerard Bunk =

German Dutch organist and composer

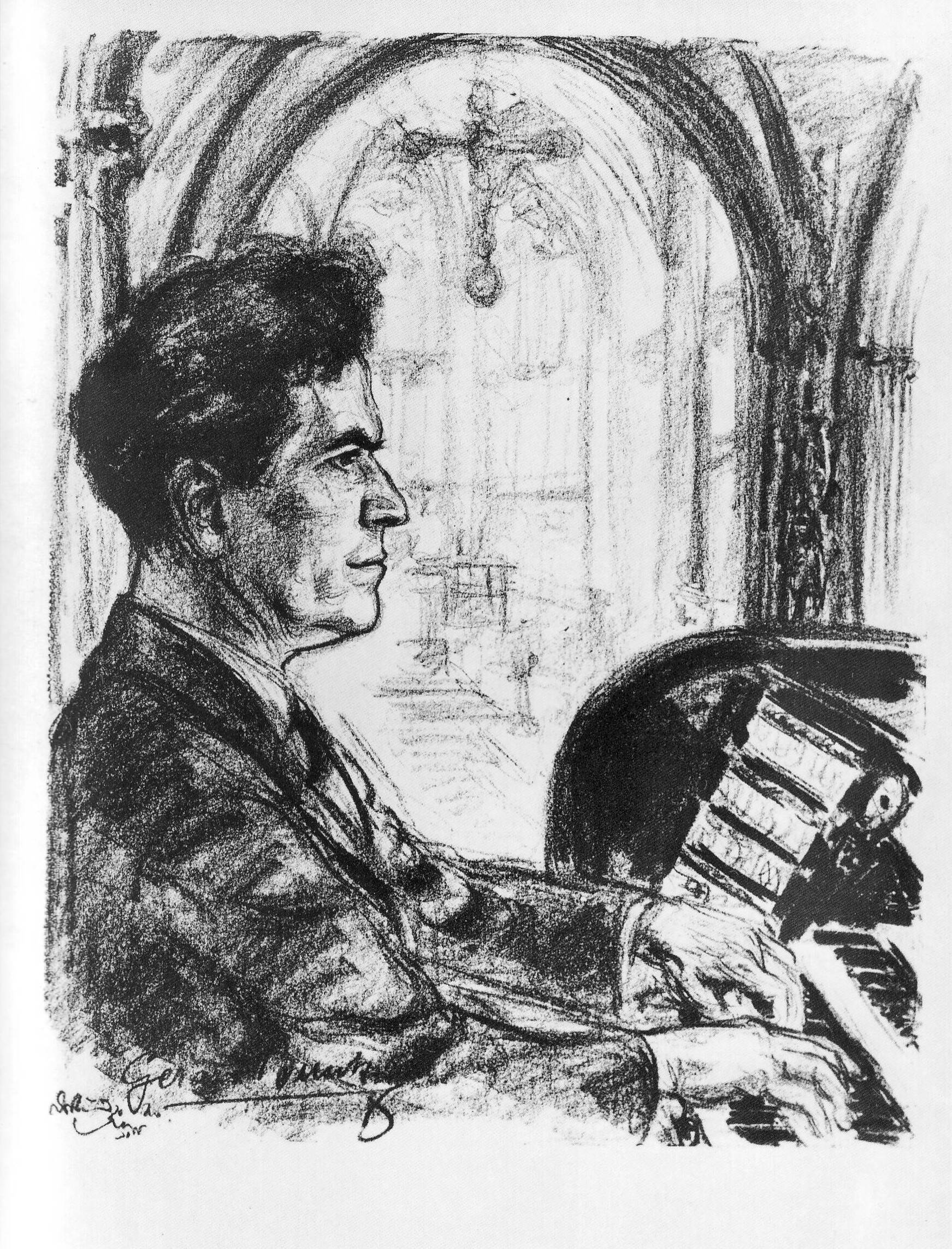
Gerard Bunk at the Walcker organ of St. Reinoldi, Dortmund – lithograph by Emil Stumpp, 1931

Gerard Bunk (born 4 March 1888 in Rotterdam; died 13 September 1958 in Kamen) was a German-Dutch organist, pianist, harpsichordist, choirmaster and composer.

== Life and work ==
Gerard Bunk was a student at the Rotterdam Conservatory of the Maatschappij tot Bevordering der Toonkunst since 1901. The focus of his education was on piano studies with Anton Verheij.

Edward Elgar, greeting card from the estate of Gerard Bunk, Plas Gwyn 1904-05

After a short stay in Hull and London (with the pianist Mark Hambourg), he came to Bielefeld in 1906 to the piano teacher Hans Hermanns, whom he followed to the Hamburg Conservatory. In 1907 Bunk became a piano teacher at the conservatory in Bielefeld.

He trained himself at the organ mainly autodidactically, whereby his pianistic skills paid off. On 20 June 1907, Bunk gave his first organ concert in the Bielefeld Synagogue. Here and in the Neustädter Marienkirche he played cyclical concert series in the following years.

On 5 May 1910, Bunk stood in for Karl Straube at the first concert of the Dortmund Max-Reger-Festival and took turns with Reger at the "giant organ" of St. Reinold's Church, which had been built the previous year. Reger then recommended him to the Dortmund Hüttner Conservatory, where Bunk taught piano and later organ playing. Enthused by the splendour of the sound of the organ in the St. Reinold's Church, Bunk declared it his life's goal to become organist of this instrument. First, however, he worked as organist at the Old Catholic Krimkapelle since 1912, and at the St. Petri Church in Dortmund since 1920. Bunk saw himself at the peak of his career when he was finally elected organist of the "epoch-making organ work" of St. Reinold's Church, considered the reference instrument of the Alsatian organ reform (Walcker V/105), and conductor of the Dortmund Bach Choir in 1925. From 1929 onwards, Bunk organised fortnightly "Orgel-Feierstunden"(Organ recitals), in which he performed a large part of the organ literature known at the time. Through the Orgel-Feierstunden, Bunk achieved the reputation of one of the leading organ artists of his time; the press called him "the living organ story". Bunk led various music associations since 1912. Among the chamber music associations to which he belonged during his life, the "Dortmund Trio" between 1920 and 1929 with the Dutch violinist and later conductor Paul van Kempen was probably the most significant.

In 1922, the Riemann Musiklexikon lists him as a "sought-after accompanist"; in fact, Bunk assisted numerous vocal and instrumental soloists at the piano; only the baritone Heinrich Schlusnus should be mentioned here as an example. From 1943 to the beginning of 1944, he toured extensively through southern Germany and Austria with the Viennese cellist Slavko Popoff; the concerts were often organised by the NS organisation "Kraft durch Freude".

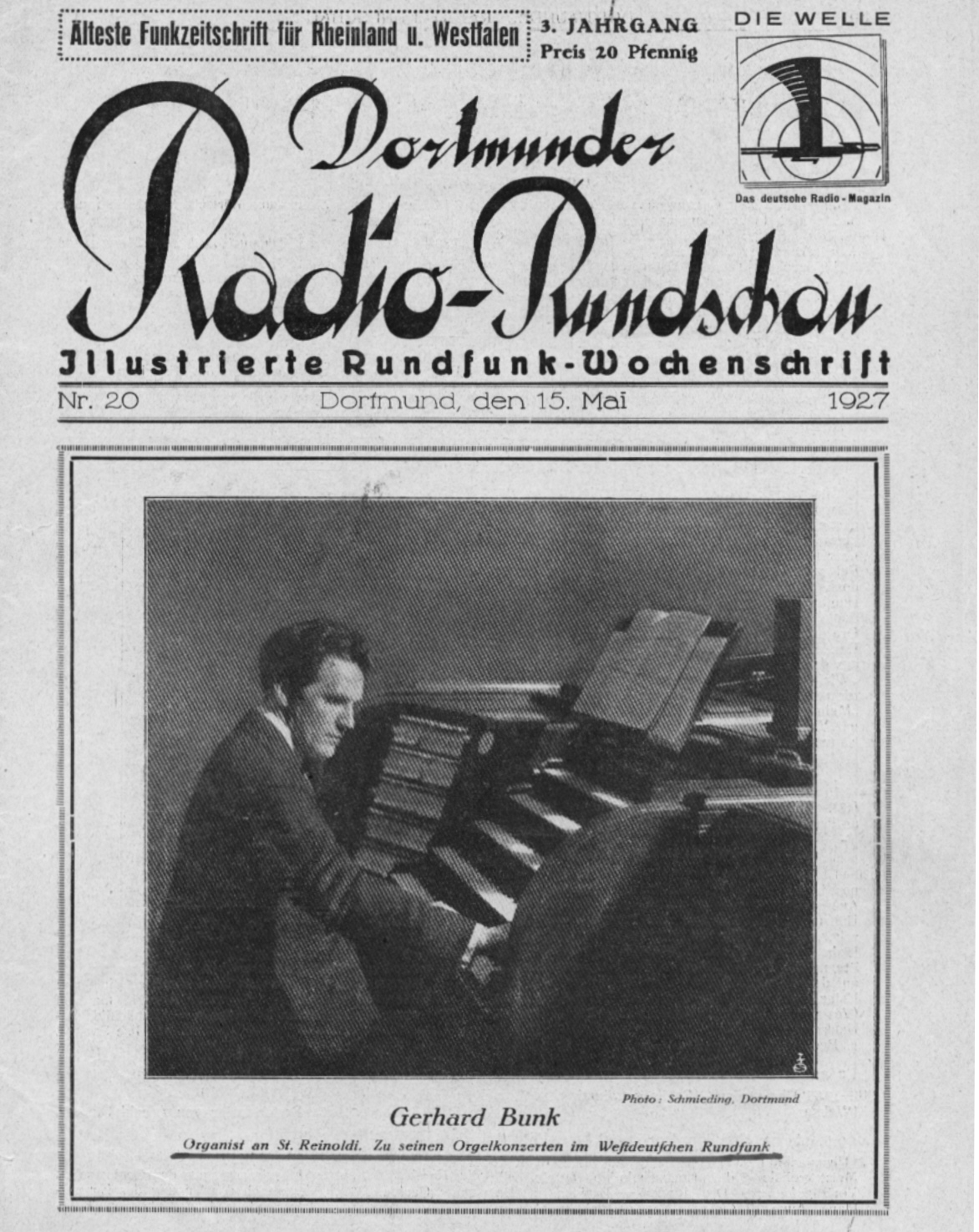
Dortmunder Radio-Rundschau of 15 May 1927: "Gerhard [sic!] Bunk. On his organ concerts on Westdeutscher Rundfunk"

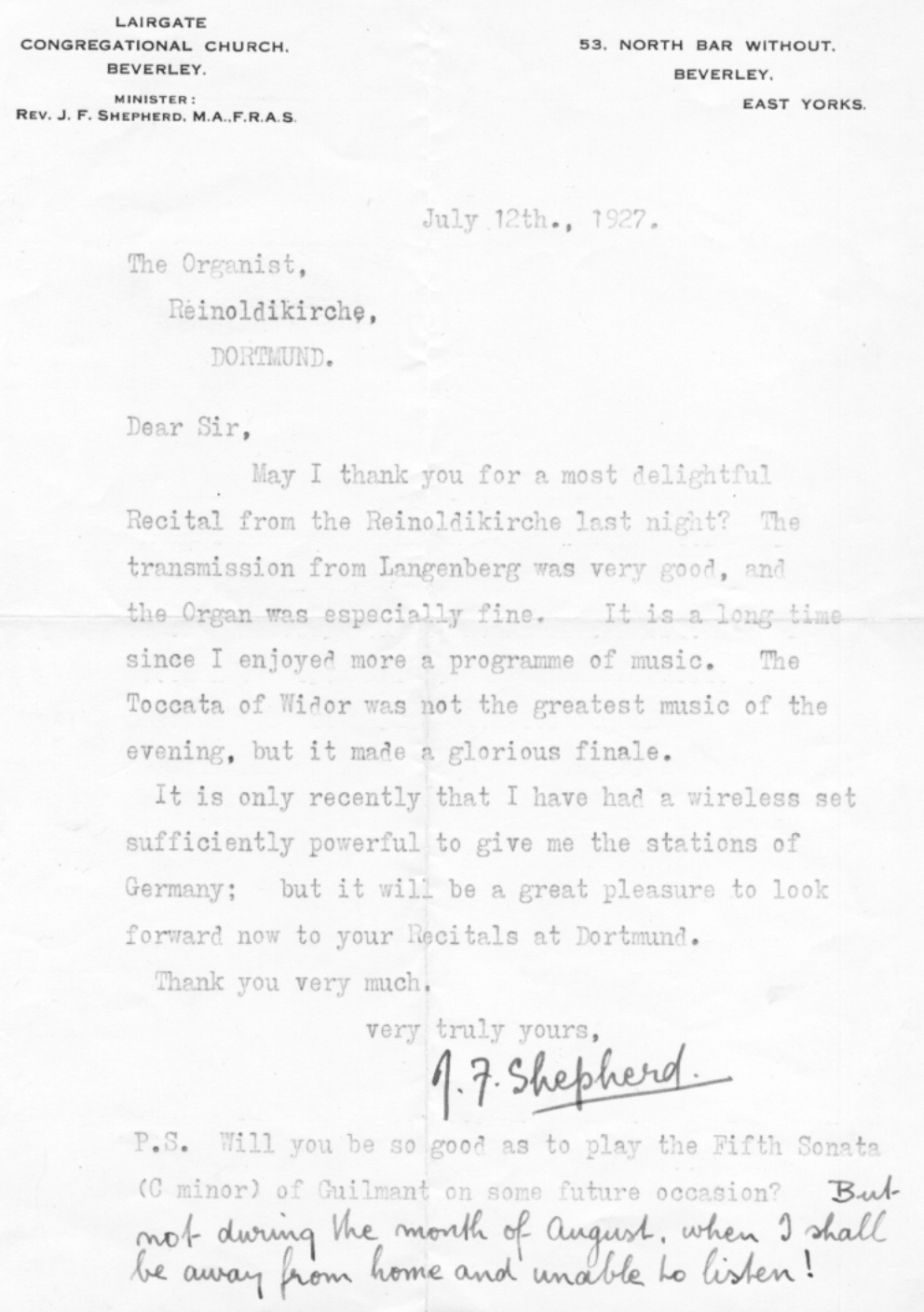
Rev. J. F. Shepherd to Gerard Bunk (July 12, 1927, Beverly, East Yorks.) on Bunk's organ concert on Westdeutscher Rundfunk

Since the beginnings of radio, Bunk could be heard in radio broadcasts of Westdeutscher Rundfunk, Radio Hilversum and others. In 1928 he obtained German citizenship. In the same year he met Albert Schweitzer, with whom he had already corresponded since 1910, at his organ concert in St. Reinold's Church. In 1930 Bunk also became organist at the Dortmund Synagogue organ, also built by Walcker, a post he resigned from on 11 May 1933 under unknown circumstances. In 1936, he was appointed Kirchenmusikdirektor by the Old Prussian Protestant High Church Council. In 1937 he bought a harpsichord from the Neupert company, on which he now also gave concerts.

With the destruction of St. Reinold's on 23 May 1943, the "Orgel-Feierstunden" were suspended. After the end of the war, Bunk conducted the Bach Choir on concert tours through the Rhineland and Westphalia. In 1954 he resumed the "Orgel-Feierstunden" on a small interim organ in the partly newly built Reinoldikirche (north aisle) with his arrangement of Bach's The Art of Fugue for the organ. In 1958 he inaugurated a new Walcker organ in St. Reinold's, which he was subsequently able to play once more.

== Composer ==
Bunk received the greatest attention as a composer with his organ works. Albert Schweitzer sees in the Legend op. 29 influences of Felix Mendelssohn Bartholdy and César Franck united and emphasises its "calm and plastic layout [...] in comparison with the formlessness and restlessness now in use [1910] for organ compositions". In connection with the Passacaglia in A minor, op. 40, composed in 1911, Wolfgang Stockmeier notes that "Bunk has since developed a style of unmistakable personal idiosyncrasy." Bunk wrote the children's opera Gerda based on Hans Christian Andersen's fairy tale The Snow Queen, piano pieces, works for two pianos (which he performed with his wife Else Bunk), songs, Violin sonata, two Piano trios, Piano quartet, three String quartets, choral and orchestral works, Symphonic Variations in F-sharp minor for organ and small orchestra op. 67, organ concerto in D minor op. 70. After the premiere of the Symphony in C minor op. 75 on 23 November 1925 in Karlsruhe, Bunk initially restricted his composing, perhaps because of the work he had begun at St. Reinold's, but probably also because of the general stylistic shift towards new music.

As his particular reaction to the events of the war, according to librettist Martha Heinemann allegedly "under the impression of the destruction of his home town Rotterdam" on 14 May, but above all as a sign in the anti-clerical times in Germany, he began in 1940 the Oratorio Groß ist Gottes Herrlichkeit (Great is God's Glory) based on the Old Testament (Book of Sirach 43: On God's Glory in Nature), in which he made a confession of his faith in late Romantic sounds. After the premiere in 1948, he wrote mainly arrangements of his own works and those of others. The most famous became his transcription of The Musical Offering by Johann Sebastian Bach for the organ (Breitkopf & Härtel, Wiesbaden 1956). As early as the 1910s (probably 1914), his piano versions of Frederick Delius' Two pieces for small orchestra (On Hearing the First Cuckoo in Spring and Summer Night on the River) had been written. During the Christmas holidays of 1914, i. e. precisely during the Christmas truce, the Legend for organ and brass quartet was written, which the later editors characterise in the preface as a "peaceful meditation" (Bärenreiter, Kassel 2022).

== Works (selection) ==
=== Choral works ===
- Der 1. Psalm for soprano solo, choir and organ op. 47 (1912). Bärenreiter, Kassel 2013
- Weihnachtslegende for three female voices op. 72 (1921). Bärenreiter, Kassel 2013
- Selig seid ihr Armen, Motet for eight-part choir a cappella op. 77 (1930/57). Bärenreiter, Kassel 2013
- Sollt ich meinem Gott nicht singen, Motet for four-part choir a cappella op. 83 (1947). Bärenreiter, Kassel 2013

=== Organ works ===
==== Single issues ====
- 7 Varieties op O Sanctissima op. 4a (1906). Dr. J. Butz (in: O Sanctissima! Romantische Orgelbearbeitungen des Weihnachtsliedes O du fröhliche), Sankt Augustin 1999
- Einleitung, Variationen und Fuge über ein altniederländisches Volkslied D minor op. 31 (1908). Butz, Sankt Augustin 2000
- Sonate F minor op. 32 (1909/10; revised 1930). Bärenreiter, Kassel 2002
- Marche festivale A major op. 43 / Pièce héroïque C major op. 49 (1912/1914). Butz (as Zwei festliche Orgelstücke), Sankt Augustin 2004
- 8 Charakterstücke op. 54 (1910–1919). Möseler (Schott Music), Wolfenbüttel 2003
- 6 Orgelstücke op. 65 (1919–1936). Möseler (Schott Music), Wolfenbüttel 2006
- Choralimprovisationen (1956–1958). Butz, Sankt Augustin 2002

==== Complete edition ====
- Complete Organ Works. Bärenreiter, Kassel 2008–2015

I

- 7 Variaties op O Sanctissima op. 4a (1906)
- Preludium en Fuga over een thema uit de Eroica-Symphonie van Beethoven op. 8 (1906)
- Sonatine D minor op. 10 (1906/07)
- 4 Orgelstücke im polyphonen Styl op. 12 (1906/07)
- 5 Orgelstücke op. 16 (1907)

II

- Praeludium und Fuga D minor op. 17 (1907)
- 5 Orgelstücke op. 18 (1907)
- 5 Stücke op. 28 (1907–1912)
- Legende G minor op. 29 (1908)

III

- Einleitung, Variationen und Fuge über ein altniederländisches Volkslied D minor op. 31 (1908)
- Sonate F minor op. 32 (1909/10; revised 1930)
- Passacaglia A minor op. 40 (1911; revised 1929)

IV

- Marche festivale A major op. 43 (1912)
- Pièce héroïque C major op. 49 (1914)
- 8 Charakterstücke op. 54 (1910–1919)
- Fantasie C minor op. 57 (1915)

V

- 6 Orgelstücke op. 65 (1916–1936)
- Variationen und Fuge über das Altniederländische Volkslied Merck toch hoe sterck for harpsichord op. 80 (1937)
- Musik für Orgel C minor op. 81 (1939)

VI

- Wilhelmus van Nassouwe en Choral Nun danket alle Gott (1907)
- Kleine Fantasie über C.H.D.B. for organ or piano (?)
- Choralvorspiel Wachet auf, ruft uns die Stimme (1956?)
- (37) Choralimprovisationen (1956–1958)
- Gerard Bunk: Liebe zur Orgel. Erinnerungen aus einem Musikerleben (Memories from a Musician's Life; CD with facsimile of the first edition)

- Selected Organ Works. Breitkopf, Wiesbaden 1996

- Legende G minor op. 29
- Passacaglia A minor op. 40
- Fantasie C minor op. 57

==== Organ and voice or instruments ====
- Bist du bei mir, Aria in old style for mezzo-soprano (or soprano) and organ, ad libitum violoncello op. 20 (1907) / Wo du hingehst, Aria in old style for mezzo-soprano and organ, ad libitum Violin, Viola or Oboe op. 27 (1908). Butz (as „Zwei Arien“), Sankt Augustin 2003
- Legende F minor for organ and brass quartet op. 55a (1914). Bärenreiter, Kassel 2022
- Legende F sharp minor for organ and string orchestra or string quartet op. 55b (1945). Butz, Sankt Augustin 1999
- Andante sostenuto E major for organ and string orchestra op. 75IIIa (1923–1925; arranged 1948). Butz, Sankt Augustin 2003

=== Autobiography ===
Gerard Bunk: Liebe zur Orgel. Erinnerungen aus einem Musikerleben. Dortmund 1958

== Literature ==
- Jan Boecker: „Liebe zur Orgel“ – Zum 100. Geburtstag von Gerard Bunk. In: Ars Organi. 36. 4/1988, p. 176–182.
- Jan Boecker: „Die Orgel störrisch, aber gemeistert...“ – Die Konzertauftritte des niederländischen Organisten, Pianisten und Komponisten Gerard Bunk (1888–1958) in Deutschland in Kaiserreich, Weimarer Republik und „Drittem Reich“. Mit einem Werkverzeichnis. Dissertation. Münster 1995.
- Jan Boecker: Gerard Bunk. Een Nederlands componist herontdekt. In: Het Orgel. 96, 2/2000, p. 5–11.
- Jan Boecker: Trutzlied mit Variationen – Gerard Bunk und sein Opus 31 für Orgel. In: Organ – Journal für die Orgel. 5, 3/2002, p. 3–13.
- Jan Boecker: „… was Menschengeist auch hat ersonnen …“ Gerard Bunk als Organist in den Jahren 1933 bis 1945. In: Organ – Journal für die Orgel. 8, 2/2005, p. 34–41.
- Jan Boecker: Foxtrott, Edelweiß und ein Orgelstück. Die Zermatt-Episode Gerard Bunks, Sommer 1923. In: „…in Himmelsnähe“ Für Wolfgang Stockmeier. Ein Buch der Freunde und Kollegen zum 75. Geburtstag. Editors Michael Heinemann and Antje Wissemann. Strube, München 2006, p. 79–87.
- Jan Boecker: Gerard Bunk – Liebe zur Orgel. In: Orgelbewegung und Spätromantik. Orgelmusik zwischen den Weltkriegen in Deutschland, Österreich und der Schweiz. Editors Michael Heinemann and Birger Petersen. Butz, Bonn 2017, S. 157–166.
- Nicholas Fogg: Gerard Bunk (1888–1958). In: The Journal of the Organ Club 2006. II, p. 72–83.
- Émile Rupp: Die Entwicklungsgeschichte der Orgelbaukunst. Benziger, Einsiedeln 1929.
- François Sabatier: Gerard Bunk: des Pays-Bas à l'Allemagne. In: L’Orgue. N° 319–320, 2017, p. 23–33.
- Rudolf Schroeder: Musik in St. Reinoldi zu Dortmund vom Mittelalter bis in unsere Zeit. Sonderdruck aus: Beiträge zur Geschichte Dortmunds und der Grafschaft Mark. Bd. 63/1966.
- Rudolf Schroeder: Das Dortmunder Konservatorium. Westfälisches. Musikarchiv, Dortmund 1969.
- Rudolf Schroeder: Gerard Bunk 1888–1958. Wulff, Dortmund 1974.
- Oscar Walcker: Dortmund, Reinoldikirche, 1909. In: Erinnerungen eines Orgelbauers. Bärenreiter, Kassel 1948, p. 73–79.
