= Jean Allister =

Northern Ireland born, opera singer

Jean Allister (26 February 1932 – 11 July 2012) was an opera singer who encompassed a wide range of repertoire both on stage and on the concert platform in a career spanning over 30 years.

== Life and career ==
Allister was born in Ballymoney. She studied under Norman Allin at the Royal Academy of Music and her early roles included Mistress Quickly at the Academy in 1954, and parts in Elijah at the Royal Festival Hall, and Handel's Belshazzar at the Foundling Hospital in July 1955. She married her fellow student the tenor Edgar Fleet in 1955 and they worked together in several performances including Britten's Spring Symphony at the Royal Academy and Abraham and Isaac at the Royal Court Theatre. They had one son together.

She became a member of the Ambrosian Singers where among fellow altos she sang alongside Pamela Bowden, Heather Harper and Helen Watts. From 1959 to 1970, she sang in fifteen Proms concerts at the Royal Albert Hall, including Henze's Novae de Infinito Laudes with the composer in 1965 and Beethoven's Choral Symphony under Sargent in 1966, and at the Three Choirs Festivals she appeared from 1961 to 1977, where she participated in the British premiere of Martin's In Terra Pax in 1960 and the same composer's Requiem in 1975.

Her performance in the title role of The Italian Girl in Algiers at the 1961 St Pancras Arts Festival was hailed by Opera magazine: "a new coloratura mezzo, Jean Allister […] Her tone was rich and warm, and remained so right through the range, not growing hard at the top or fading at the bottom. She showed a sense of the stage, a good feeling for phrase, and acceptable divisions. She offered in all ways a delightful impersonation of Rossini's resourceful heroine, and each of the arias made its proper effect".

In May 1961, Allister took one of the sixteen lines in Vaughan Williams's Serenade to Music at Charles Groves' farewell concert with the Bournemouth Symphony Orchestra and later sang Mahler's Symphony of a Thousand under him at the Proms in 1964.

For Glyndebourne Opera her roles included Dryade in Ariadne auf Naxos, Arnalta in L'incoronazione di Poppea, also at the Proms in 1963, and Melide in Cavalli's L'Ormindo in 1968 which also toured to Ghent, Brussels, and Munich. In 1966, Allister was described as “admirable” as the rag-picker in Il tabarro for Welsh National Opera. In Handel's Scipio in Hanover in 1970, Jean Allister sang Lucejo with Charles Farncombe conducting.

She sang Queen Arete in Berkeley's Castaway at the Aldeburgh Festival in June 1967, and as the nanny in the premiere of Gardner's The Visitors there in 1972, Musical Times pronounced her “outstanding”. Her final stage appearance was as Grandmother Buryjovka in the English National Opera North production of Jenůfa in Leeds in 1980. Following this, she taught privately and at the Leeds City College of Music, and lived in the city with her second husband, René Atkinson.

Allister edited the book Sing Solo Soprano, published by Oxford University Press in 1986.

She died in Church Crookham, aged 80.

== Discography ==
- Purcell Dido and Aeneas 1959 (First witch) conducted by Britten (BBC Music BBCB 8003-2)
- Cavalli L'Ormindo (Helide) 1968 conducted by Leppard (Decca)
- Williamson The Happy Prince (Seamstress) 1965 conducted Marcus Dods (Decca)
- Delius Koanga (Clotilda) Kingsway Hall 19–26 September 1973 - Groves (HMV)
- Stravinsky Mass / Colin Davis; 1963 : (L'Oiseau-Lyre LP).

During the 1960s she recorded a significant number of roles in Sullivan operettas, such as The Mikado (Katisha) for EMI; and The Pirates of Penzance (Edith), Ruddigore (Mad Margaret), Utopia Ltd (excerpt - Lady Sophy) and The Sorcerer (Mrs. Partlet) for Decca. In February 1963 she also took part in recordings of selections from The Gondoliers, HMS Pinafore, Iolanthe, The Mikado, Patience and The Pirates of Penzance with the Royal Philharmonic Orchestra under James Walker for Reader's Digest, in which her first husband Edgar Fleet also took part.
