= Anton Sistermans =

Dutch baritone (1865–1926)

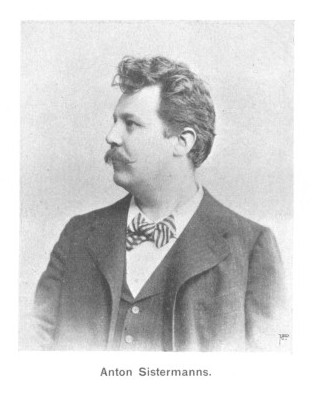
Anton Sistermans, 1900

Anton Sistermans (5 August 1865 – 5 March 1926) was a Dutch baritone during the late 19th to early 20th century. He is particularly notable for interpretations of lieder and oratorios. During his career, Sistermans premiered important compositions by Johannes Brahms and Gustav Mahler, and also had lieder dedicated to him by Hans Pfitzner, Eugen d'Albert and Alexander von Zemlinsky. In his later years, Sistermans served as a teacher at the Royal Conservatory of The Hague and conductor of a church choir in Rotterdam.

== Biography ==
Anton Sistermans was born in 's-Hertogenbosch, in 1865. He was initially a choir boy, then studied under Julius Stockhausen in Frankfurt. His solo debut was in 1889, in a performance of the Verdi Requiem in Strasbourg.

He performed Beethoven's Kantate auf den Tod Kaiser Josephs II (cantata in memory of Joseph II) and Ninth Symphony in a concert in Wuppertal on 17 December 1892, which also included Beethoven's Piano Concerto No. 5 and was conducted by Hans Haym. On 16 March 1896, he premiered the orchestral version of Gustav Mahler's Lieder eines fahrenden Gesellen in Berlin, with the composer conducting the Berlin Philharmonic. On 9 November of the same year, Sistermans gave the first performance of Johannes Brahms's Vier ernste Gesänge in Vienna with pianist Coenraad V. Bos. The composer declined Sisterman's requests to be the pianist at the premiere performance, likely because Brahms could not bear to hear the songs in light of the imminent death of Clara Schumann, with whom they were closely associated. Whether Brahms attended the premiere at all is a matter of dispute among sources.

Edvard Grieg requested Sistermans, who was then "by some considered the best singer of Lieder", to sing his Scenes from Olav Trygvason at the Leeds Festival on 16 October 1907.

Sisterman appeared in operatic performances, but these were fewer in number. His performances included Gurnemanz in Parsifal and Pogner in Die Meistersinger von Nürnberg, at the 1899 Bayreuth Festival; Titurel in Parsifal in Amsterdam in 1919; and Tommaso in Eugen d'Albert's Tiefland in the Hague in 1923.

He made a few sparse recordings in 1904 and 1906, limited to selected lieder of Brahms. He later taught at the Klindworth-Scharwenka Conservatory in Berlin, the Royal Conservatory of The Hague, and conducted a church choir in Rotterdam.

Works dedicated to him include:

- Eugen d'Albert: "Heimliche Aufforderung" from 5 Lieder, Op. 21
- Hans Pfitzner: Five Lieder, Op. 9
- Erich Jaques Wolff: song, "Tag meines Lebens", Op. 13/2
- Alexander von Zemlinsky: Thirteen Songs, Op. 2

Anton Sistermans died in the Hague in 1926, aged 60.
