= Cynara (Delius) =

Frederick Delius in 1907

Cynara is a setting by Frederick Delius of a poem by Ernest Dowson, for solo baritone voice and orchestra.

Delius worked on the piece in 1907 as part of his score for Songs of Sunset, but abandoned this setting as he felt it did not fit with the other poems by Dowson. He left it incomplete. The sketches were rediscovered in 1929 by Delius's assistant, Eric Fenby (the composer Philip Heseltine, otherwise Peter Warlock, also claimed credit for the discovery). Delius dictated to Fenby a setting of the final four lines, and the completed score was sent to Heseltine who was assisting Sir Thomas Beecham in the organisation of a Delius Festival to be held in London during October 1929.

Cynara was premiered at the Queen's Hall on 18 October 1929; John Goss was the soloist, with the BBC Orchestra conducted by Beecham.

There are several available recordings of the work.
