= Songs of Sunset =

Choral and orchestral work by Frederick Delius

Frederick Delius, photographed in 1907

Songs of Sunset is a work by Frederick Delius, written in 1906–07, and scored for mezzo-soprano and baritone soli, SATB chorus and large orchestra. The words are by Ernest Dowson.

It was published in 1911, and a German translation was made by Delius's wife Jelka Rosen, as Sonnenuntergangs-Lieder.

The work was first performed at the Queen's Hall in London on 16 June 1911 at an all-Delius concert in the presence of the composer, conducted by his great champion Thomas Beecham. The soloists were Julia Culp and Thorpe Bates, with the Edward Mason Choir and Beecham Symphony Orchestra. Other works performed that night were Paris: The Song of a Great City, the Dance Rhapsody, and Appalachia.

The occasion was also the first meeting of Delius with Philip Heseltine, then a 16-year-old Eton schoolboy, who had seen a copy of the score and wanted nothing more than to hear it. The school's permission had to be obtained for him to attend the concert. That meeting led to a lifelong friendship between the two, even though Delius was almost 33 years older than Heseltine.

Songs of Sunset was dedicated to the Elberfeld Choral Society, whose chief conductor Hans Haym was one of Delius's greatest supporters in Germany. The Elberfeld chorus performed it first in 1914. Hans Haym later wrote, "This is not a work for a wide public, but rather for a smallish band of musical isolates who are born decadents and life's melancholics".

== Words ==
The work consists of eight poems by Ernest Dowson:

1. "A song of the setting sun!" (chorus)
2. "Cease smiling, Dear!" a little while be sad (mezzo-soprano, baritone)
3. "Pale amber sunlight falls across" (chorus)
4. "O Mors!" (Exceeding sorrow consumeth my sad heart!) (mezzo-soprano)
5. "Exile" (By the sad waters of separation) (baritone)
6. "In Spring" (See how the trees and osiers lithe) (chorus)
7. "I was not sorrowful, I could not weep" (baritone)
8. "Vitae summa" (They are not long, the weeping and the laughter) (mezzo-soprano, baritone, chorus).

A setting for voice and piano of "Vitae summa", written in Jelka Rosen's hand, was found in Delius's papers after his death; it may have been his first thoughts about the music.

Delius had originally also set Dowson's poem "Non sum qualis eram bonae sub Regno Cynarae" for baritone solo and orchestra, as part of the score, but abandoned it as not fitting well with the overall scheme. It lay forgotten and not quite complete until 1929, when Eric Fenby discovered it and prompted Delius to complete it as a separate work in its own right, which he called Cynara.

== Recordings ==
Songs of Sunset has been recorded a number of times:

- Olga Haley, Roy Henderson, London Select Choir, London Philharmonic Orchestra, Sir Thomas Beecham (live recording, 1934 Leeds Festival)
- Nancy Evans, Redvers Llewellyn, Royal Philharmonic Orchestra, Sir Thomas Beecham
- Maureen Forrester, John Cameron, Beecham Choral Society, Royal Philharmonic Orchestra, Sir Thomas Beecham (1957)
- Janet Baker, John Shirley-Quirk, Royal Liverpool Philharmonic Chorus and Orchestra, Charles Groves (1968)
- Sarah Walker, Sir Thomas Allen, Ambrosian Singers, Royal Philharmonic Orchestra, Eric Fenby
- Sally Burgess, Bryn Terfel, Bournemouth Symphony Orchestra and Chorus, Richard Hickox
- Henriette Bonde-Hansen, Johan Reuter, Aarhus Cathedral Choir, Aarhus Symphony Orchestra and Choir, Bo Holten
