= Franz Naval =

Austrian opera singer

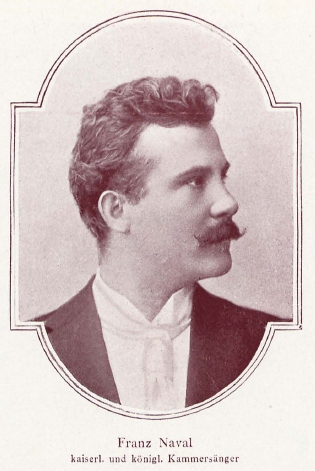
Franz Naval, 1903.

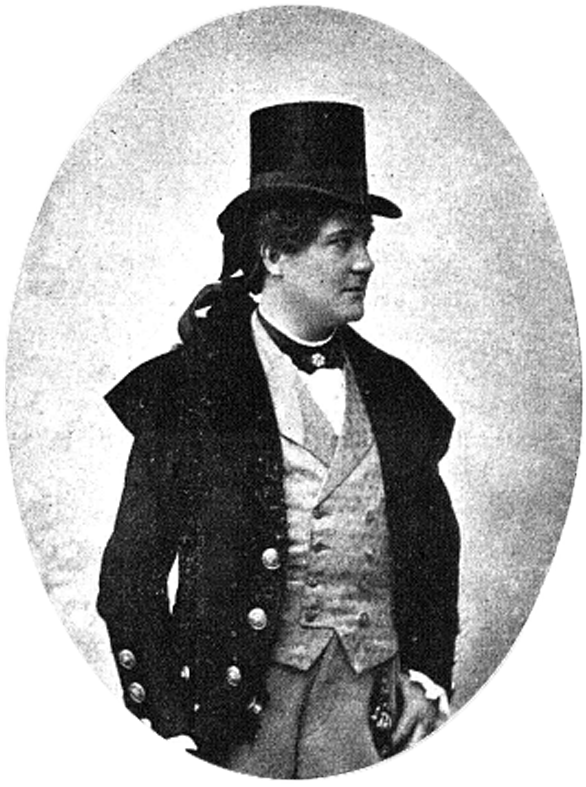
Franz Naval as George Brown in La Dame blanche (Volksoper Wien, 23 March 1905)

Franz Naval, real name Franz Pogačnik (20 October 1865 in Ljubljana, Slovenia – 9 August 1939 in Vienna) was an Austrian operatic lyric tenor.

== Sources ==
- U. Harten: "Pogačnik Franz". In: Österreichisches Biographisches Lexikon 1815–1950 (ÖBL). Vol. 8, Austrian Academy of Sciences, Vienna 1983, ISBN 3-7001-0187-2, p. 150.
- Franz Naval on OeML
- K. J. Kutsch, Leo Riemens: Großes Sängerlexikon. original edition. K. G. Saur, Bern, 1993, second volume M–Z, p. 2078, ISBN 3-907820-70-3
- Michael Wolf, Klaus Edel: Ausgesuchte Prominentengräber auf dem Evangelischen Friedhof Simmering. Eine Einführung in die Geschichte des Friedhofes und ein Begleiter zu ausgesuchten Prominentengräbern. Published by Evangelischen Presseverband in Österreich, Vienna 2000.
- Felix Czeike: Historischer Lexikon Wien, Vienna 1995, p. 358
