= Ernest Dowson =

English writer (1867–1900)

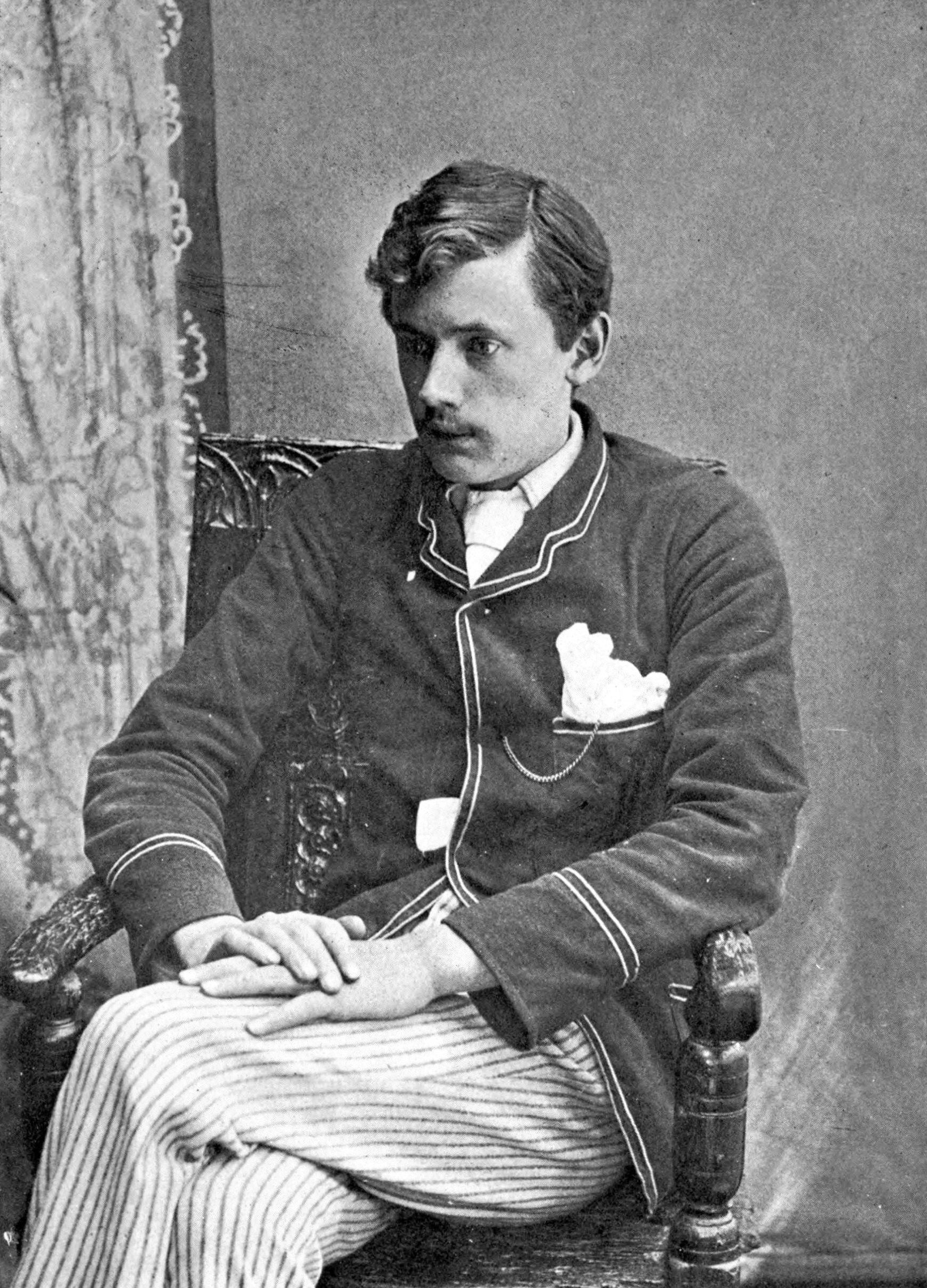
- Born: Ernest Christopher Dowson; 2 August 1867; Lee, Kent, England
- Died: 23 February 1900 (aged 32); Catford, Kent, England
- Education: The Queen's College, Oxford
- Occupations: Poet, novelist, and short-story writer
- Notable work: Non sum qualis eram bonae sub regno Cynarae (poem)
- Movement: Decadent movement
- Relatives: Alfred Domett (great-uncle)

Ernest Christopher Dowson (2 August 1867 – 23 February 1900) was an English poet, novelist, and short-story writer. Despite his short lifespan, he made a lasting impression on the literature of the English fin-de-siècle through his Decadent poetry.

After Dowson's death, his collected poetry was published in an edition illustrated by the artist Aubrey Beardsley, with an introduction by the poet Arthur Symons.

== Biography ==
Ernest Dowson was born in Lee, then in Kent, in 1867. His great-uncle was Alfred Domett, a Prime Minister of New Zealand. Dowson attended The Queen's College, Oxford, but left in March 1888 without obtaining a degree. In November 1888, Dowson started work at Dowson & Son, his father's dry-docking business in Limehouse, East London. He led an active social life, carousing with medical students and law pupils, visiting music halls, and taking the performers to dinner. In 1891, Dowson converted to Roman Catholicism, and in 1893 he proposed to Adelaide Foltinowicz, the daughter of a Polish restaurant-owner. She rejected his proposal and later married a tailor.

Dowson was a member of the Rhymers' Club, and a contributor to literary magazines such as The Yellow Book and The Savoy. In October 1892, he was commissioned by William Theodore Peters to write a rhyming playlet that would ultimately become The Pierrot of the Minute (1897). He collaborated with Arthur Moore on two unsuccessful novels, worked on a novel of his own, Madame de Viole, and wrote reviews for The Critic. Later in his career Dowson became a translator of French fiction, including novels by Balzac and the Goncourt brothers, and Les Liaisons dangereuses by Choderlos de Laclos.

In August 1894, Dowson's father, suffering from tuberculosis, died of an overdose of Chlorodyne. In February 1895 his mother, who also had tuberculosis, hanged herself. Soon after her death Dowson's health began to decline rapidly. Leonard Smithers gave Dowson an allowance to live in France and make translations for him. However, in 1897 Dowson returned to London to live with the Foltinowicz family. In 1899 Robert Sherard found Dowson almost penniless in a wine bar. Sherard took him to his cottage in Catford, where Dowson spent his last six weeks. On 23 February 1900, Dowson died in Catford at the age of 32. He was interred in Lewisham Cemetery later renamed Ladywell Cemetery of the present twinned cemeteries of Brockley and Ladywell Cemeteries in London.

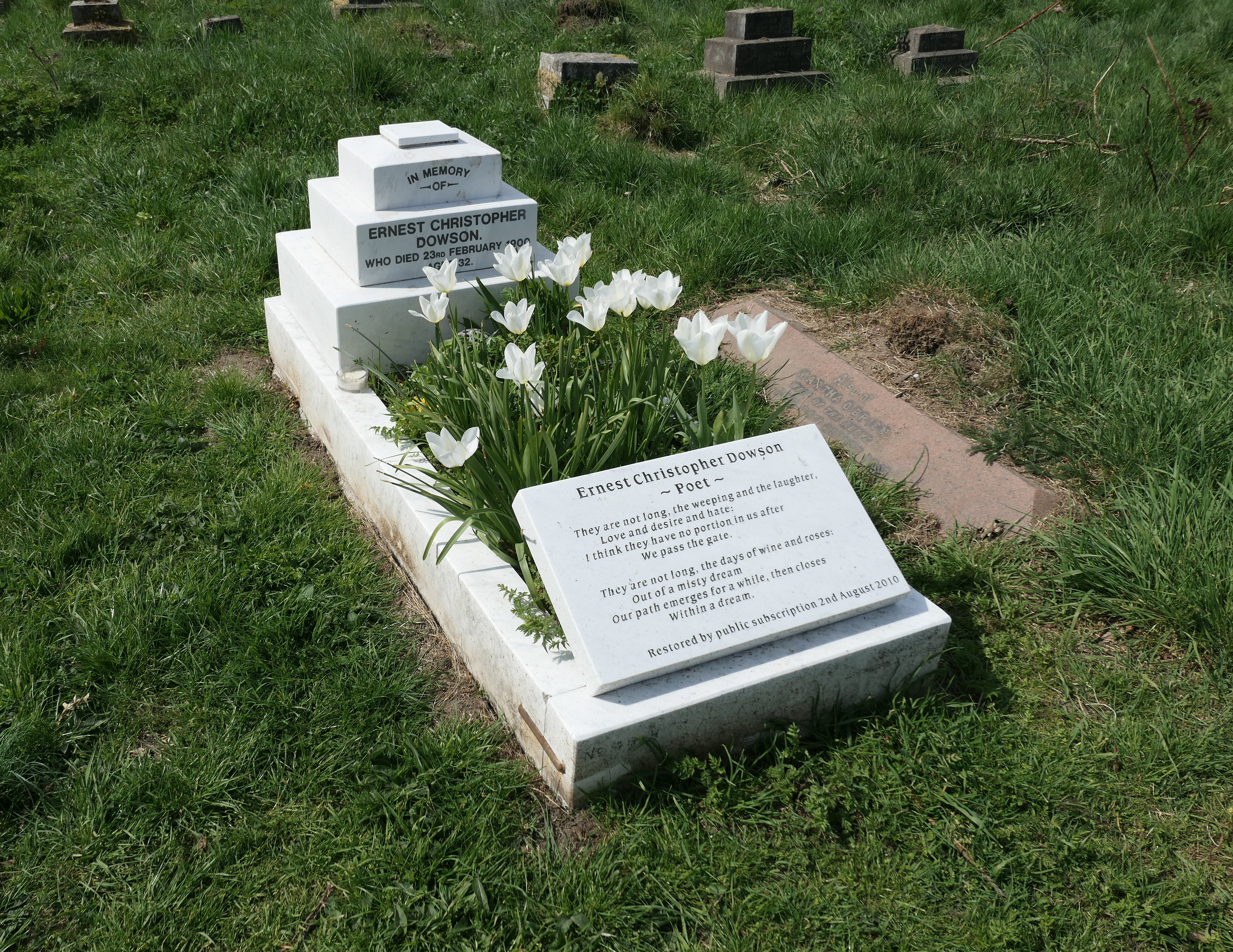

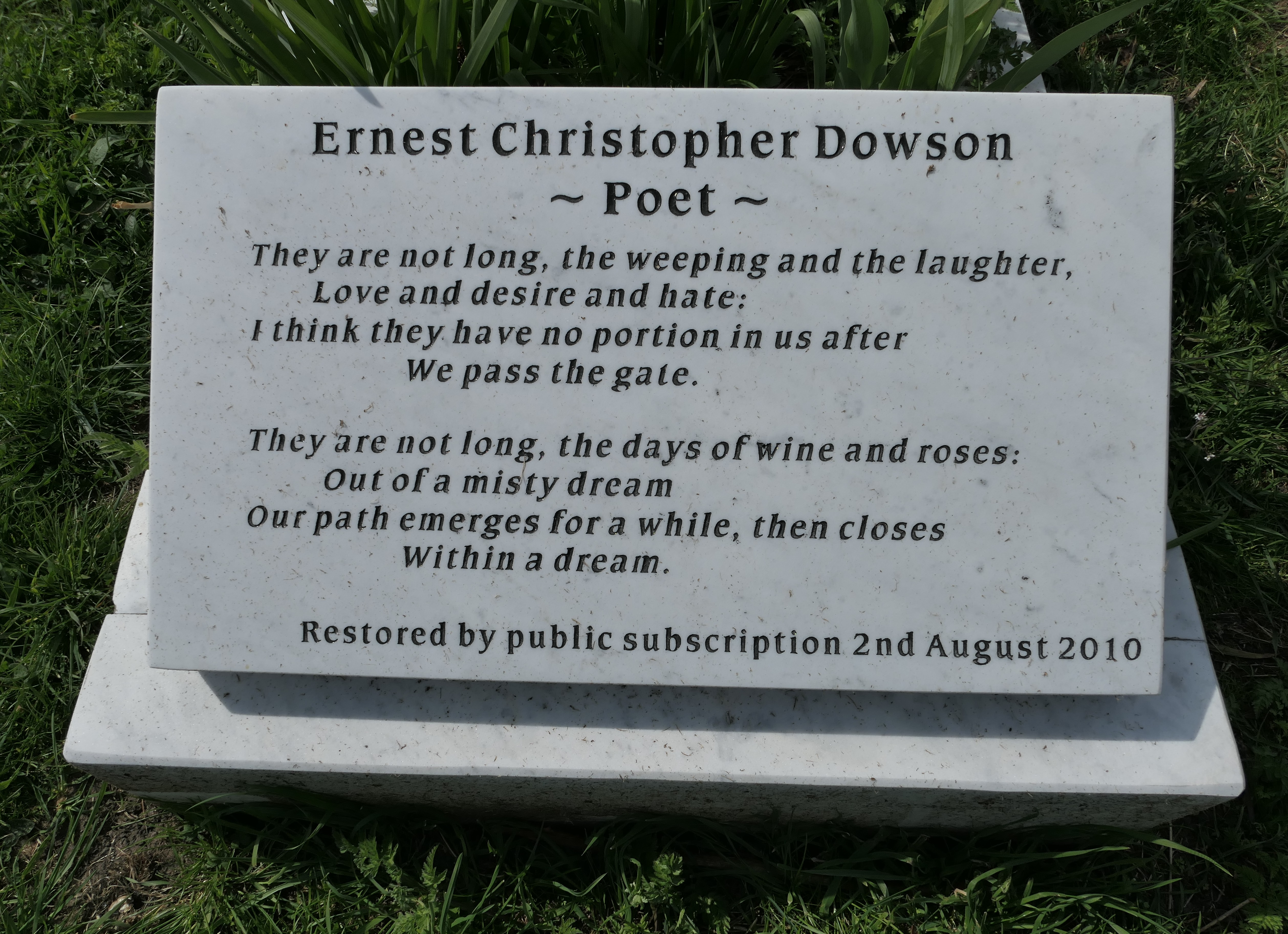

== Works ==
Dowson is best remembered for three phrases from his poems:

- "Days of wine and roses", from the poem "Vitae Summa Brevis" (Note: Vitae summa brevis ("Life's short sum") is a quotation from Horace's Odes, Book I, 4.)
- "Gone with the wind", from the poem ''Non sum qualis eram bonae sub regno Cynarae" (Note: Non sum qualis eram bonae sub regno Cynarae ("I am not what I was, under the reign of the good Cynara") is a quotation from Horace's Odes, Book IV, 1.)
- "I have been faithful ... in my fashion", from "Non sum qualis eram bonae sub regno Cynarae"

J. P. Miller called a television play Days of Wine and Roses (1958) and the film of the same title was based on the play. The phrase also inspired the song "Days of Wine and Roses".

They are not long, the days of wine and roses:
Out of a misty dream
Our path emerges for a while, then closes
Within a dream.

— Ernest Dowson, from "Vitae Summa Brevis" (1896).

I have forgot much, Cynara! gone with the wind,
Flung roses, roses riotously with the throng,
Dancing, to put thy pale, lost lilies out of mind;
But I was desolate and sick of an old passion,
Yea, all the time, because the dance was long:
I have been faithful to thee, Cynara! in my fashion.

— Ernest Dowson, from "Non sum qualis eram bonae sub regno Cynarae", third stanza (1891).

Margaret Mitchell, touched by the "far away, faintly sad sound I wanted" in the first line of the third stanza of "Non sum qualis eram bonae sub regno Cynarae", chose the line as the title of her novel Gone with the Wind.

"Non sum qualis eram bonae sub regno Cynarae" is also the source of the phrase "I have been faithful ... in my fashion", as in the title of the film Faithful in My Fashion (1946). Cole Porter paraphrased Dowson in the song "Always True to You in My Fashion" in the musical Kiss Me, Kate. Morrissey uses the lines, "In my own strange way, / I've always been true to you. / In my own sick way, / I'll always stay true to you" in the song "Speedway" on the album Vauxhall & I.

According to the Oxford English Dictionary, Dowson provides the earliest recorded use of the word "soccer" in written language, although he spelled it "socca". (Note: "I absolutely decline to see socca' matches." (letter by Dowson, 21 February 1889). Soccer, in Oxford English Dictionary online, (subscription required), retrieved 30 April 2014.)

Dowson's prose works include the short stories collected as Dilemmas (1895), and the two novels A Comedy of Masks (1893) and Adrian Rome (each co-written with Arthur Moore).

"Non sum qualis eram bonae sub regno Cynarae" was first published in The Century Guild Hobby Horse in April 1891. It was later reprinted in The Second Book of the Rhymer's Club in 1894, and was noticed by Richard Le Gallienne in his "Wanderings in Bookland" column in The Idler, Volume 9.

=== Books ===
- A Comedy of Masks: A Novel (1893) With Arthur Moore.
- Dilemmas, Stories and Studies in Sentiment (1895)
- Verses (1896)
- The Pierrot of the Minute: A Dramatic Phantasy in One Act (1897)
- Decorations in Verse and Prose (1899)
- Adrian Rome (1899), with Arthur Moore
- Cynara: A Little Book of Verse (1907)
- Studies in Sentiment (1915)
- The Poems and Prose of Ernest Dowson, with a Memoir by Arthur Symons (1919)
- Letters of Ernest Dowson (1968)
- Collected Shorter Fiction (2003)

== Legacy ==
- In a letter to Leonard Smithers, Oscar Wilde wrote of the death of Dowson: "Poor wounded wonderful fellow that he was, a tragic reproduction of all tragic poetry, like a symbol, or a scene. I hope bay leaves will be laid on his tomb, and rue and myrtle too, for he knew what love is."
- Arthur Moore wrote several comic novels about the young adult duo of Anthony "Tony" Wilder and Paul Morrow. Tony is based on Dowson, while Paul is based on Moore. Moore's novel The Eyes of Light is mentioned by E. Nesbit in her novel The Phoenix and the Carpet.
- In a memoir included in Poems and Prose of Ernest Dowson (1919) Arthur Symons describes Dowson as "a man who was undoubtedly a man of genius ... There never was a poet to whom verse came more naturally. ... He had the pure lyric gift, unweighed or unballasted by any other quality of mind or emotion."
- Frederick Delius set several of Dowson's poems to music in his Songs of Sunset and Cynara.
- John Ireland set Dowson's poem "I Was Not Sorrowful (Spleen)" from Verses (1896) in his 1912 song cycle Songs of a Wayfarer.
- T. E. Lawrence quotes from Dowson's poem "Impenitentia Ultima" in Seven Pillars of Wisdom (Chapter 54).
- Eugene O"Neill quotes from both "Vitae Summa Brevis" and "Cynarae" in his play Long Day's Journey into Night (1941).
- Dowson's poem Vitae Summa Brevis a/k/a "Days of Wine and Roses" is recited by the character Waldo Lydecker in the 1944 Otto Preminger-directed film noir Laura and in the UK-produced TV series The Durrells in Corfu (series 2, episode 4).
- In anticipation of the anniversary of Dowson's birth on 2 August 2010 his grave, which had fallen derelict and been vandalised, was restored. The unveiling and memorial service were publicised in the South London Press, on BBC Radio 4 and in the Times Literary Supplement, and dozens of people paid tribute to the poet 110 years after his death.
- Jack London quotes from Dowson's poem "Impenitentia Ultima" in The Sea-Wolf (Chapter XXVI).
- The lyrics of The Cure's 2024 song "Alone" from the album Songs of a Lost World heavily reference Dowson's poem "Dregs."
