= Florida Suite =

Orchestral suite by Frederick Delius

Frederick Delius in 1907

The Florida Suite is an orchestral suite by English composer Frederick Delius. He composed the work in 1887 at Leipzig, after his time as manager of an orange grove in Florida, inspired by its landscape and culture, mainly centred on the St. Johns River. During this time, Delius also studied music with an organist in Jacksonville. This suite is one of the composer's more popular works. The "Daybreak" movement includes a version of the tune "La Calinda", which Delius later used in his opera Koanga.

Hans Sitt led the first performance of the work in 1888 in Leipzig. Sir Thomas Beecham was a noted champion and had a copyist's score, which he used for himself, made from the composer's original manuscript. The suite was first published in 1963. A corrected edition of the score was published in 1986.

It is an example of the type of programme music for which Delius was both lauded and disparaged.

== Movements ==
The suite consists of four movements:

1. Daybreak — Dance
2. By the River
3. Sunset — Near the Plantation
4. At Night
