= John Mitchinson (tenor) =

English opera singer (1932–2021)

John Leslie Mitchinson (31 March 1932 – 17 December 2021) was an English operatic tenor.

Mitchinson was born in Blackrod, Lancashire. He made his début singing the role of Jupiter in Handel's Semele. From 1972 to 1978, he was associated with the Sadler's Wells opera company; during that time, he created the role of the Poet in Joseph Tal's opera Massada 967 which premiered in 1972. In 1978 he joined the Welsh National Opera, with whom he worked for four years. Able to sing a variety of roles, he portrayed Peter Grimes and Tristan during this period, among others.

He sang the title role of Wagner's Rienzi in a 1976 BBC broadcast of one of the rare performances in recent history of the complete opera; a recording of this broadcast survives and has circulated.

Mitchinson married the mezzo-soprano Maureen Guy in 1958. They had two sons, David and Mark. Guy died in 2015. Mitchinson died on 17 December 2021, at the age of 89.

== Sources ==
- Grove Music Online biography
