= Paris: The Song of a Great City =

Orchetral composition by Frederick Delius

Frederick Delius, photographed in 1907

Paris: The Song of a Great City (full title: Paris, A Night Piece – The Song of a Great City) is a nocturne for orchestra composed by Frederick Delius over the period of 1899–1900. Hans Haym, to whom Delius dedicated the work, conducted the premiere on 14 December 1901 in Elberfeld, Germany. Thomas Beecham conducted the UK premiere of the work in Liverpool on 11 January 1908. The critical edition of the score, published in the late 1980s, incorporated revisions by Beecham, and included editorial work from Eric Fenby and Norman Del Mar.

Whilst drawing upon Delius's own memories of his residence in Paris, the work is not a literal depiction, but more "impressionist" in nature. Philip Heseltine noted this quality as follows:

"For Delius, Paris is not merely a city of France, whose collective life is something to be studied objectively, from a place apart, much as an entomologist studies an ants' nest; it is a corner of his own soul.

Delius had a special fondness for Paris. He lived there from 1888 to nearly the end of the century. In 1896 he met his future wife there. And in 1899 he wrote Paris: The Song of a Great City.

In his sketches for the piece, Delius wrote a series of impressions such as “mysterious city,” “city of pleasures,” “of gay music and dancing.” These images are painted in music with brushstrokes ranging from delicate to bold. The slow opening reflects the “mysterious city." This is followed by the teeming merry-go-round of Parisian nightlife, which is then interrupted by a lushly lyrical passage that may indicate the intimacies of love. Next, music from the café and music-hall are heard again, and the piece ends as the night ends, and the sounds of awakening streets can be heard as dawn slowly breaks and a new day begins.

Byron Adams has noted the stylistic influence of Richard Strauss in the work.

Anthony Payne gave a mixed characterisation of Paris, noting that it "closes the early period and foreshadows the next in passages of contemplative beauty" and was Delius's "finest work" up to that time, but also saying that it lacked "the intense personal involvement of his great work". By contrast, Hubert Foss has characterised this work as "the first of the later masterpieces" of Delius.

== Sources ==
- David Ewen, Encyclopedia of Concert Music. New York; Hill and Wang, 1959.
