= Koanga =

19th-century opera by Frederick Delius and Charles Francis Keary

- Opera by Frederick Delius
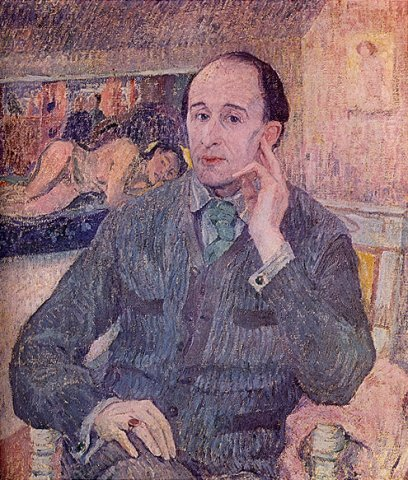
- Portrait of Delius in 1912 by Jelka Rosen
- Librettist: Charles F. Keary
- Language: English
- Based on: The Grandissimes: A Story of Creole Life by George Washington Cable
- Premiere: 13 March 1904; Stadttheater Elberfeld

Koanga is an opera written between 1896 and 1897, with music by Frederick Delius and a libretto by Charles Francis Keary, inspired partly by the book The Grandissimes: A Story of Creole Life by George Washington Cable (1880). Inspiration also came from Delius's own experiences as a young man, when his family sent him to manage an orange grove in Florida owned by them.

It was Delius's third opera, and he thought better of it than of its predecessors, Irmelin and The Magic Fountain, because of the incorporation of dance scenes and his treatment of the choruses. Koanga is reputed to be the first opera in the European tradition to base much of its melodic material on African-American music.

== Performance history ==
Koanga was the first of Delius's operas to be performed. It was also the most labour-intensive with regard to the libretto, which was continually revised. The opera was posthumously published in 1935.

It was performed privately in March 1899 at the residence of Adela Maddison in Paris. Gabriel Fauré was among the performers, and the audience included Prince Edmond de Polignac and the Princesse de Polignac. Selections from the opera were performed in London on 30 May 1899 at St James's Hall, in a concert of his own music organised by Delius.

The first public staging of the opera was at the Stadttheater Elberfeld, Germany, on 30 March 1904. It was sung in German, using a translation by Jelka Delius, and conducted by Fritz Cassirer.

Sir Thomas Beecham directed the British premiere of the full opera at the Royal Opera House, Covent Garden, on 23 September 1935. John Brownlee sang the title role, with Oda Slobodskaya as Palmyra.

In 1958 Stanford Robinson directed the BBC Chorus & Orchestra with Lawrence Winters (Koanga) and Leonora Lafayette (Palmyra).

Washington Opera staged it successfully in December 1970 at Lisner Auditorium. Frank Corsaro was the director. This was the first U.S. staging of any opera by Delius.

A revival in 1972 for the Camden Festival at Sadler's Wells Theatre, London, was conducted by Sir Charles Groves. Douglas Craig and Andrew Page had worked extensively on revisions to a performing edition, which was used for the first complete commercial recording, conducted by Groves. Robert Threlfall has examined revisions to the text of Koanga in its various editions. More recent revisions to the libretto have been by Olwen Wymark.

The single most famous musical passage from the opera contains the melody known as La Calinda, which is the only part of the score that has remained famous in the concert hall.

Eric Fenby, Delius's amanuensis, wrote of the opera as follows:

"Koanga is one of those singular works that attract attention in Delius's development, but which stand apart from the rest of his music. Usually, once a work was written, Delius's interest in it would wane. It would then be renewed and be relived temporarily every time he heard it again. For Koanga, however, he showed concern as though it held some secret bond that bound him to his youth in Florida. It was the one work he deplored in old age he was never likely to hear again. And so it proved. A dark grandeur pervades the score which, whilst yielding to hankerings after Wagner, recalls the tragic gusto of Verdi. The elements of time, place and plot allowed him a range of textures and moods wider than in his other operas."

The Pegasus Opera Company staged Koanga at Sadler's Wells Theatre in April 2007 and the Wexford Opera Festival in 2015 (broadcast by BBC Radio 3 in 2016).

William Randel has studied the relationship of the opera and its libretto to the original story by Cable.

== Roles ==
Role	Voice type	Premiere cast, 30 March 1904
Koanga, an African Prince and Voodoo Priest	baritone	Clarence Whitehill
Palmyra, a mulatto, maid and half-sister to Clotilda	soprano	Rose Kaiser
Don José Martinez, a planter	bass	Max Birkholz
Simon Perez, Don José's overseer	tenor	Georg Förster
Clotilda, Don José's wife	alto	Charlotte Lengenberg
Rangwan, a Voodoo Priest	bass	
Onkel Joe, an old slave	bass	
Renée, Hélène, Jeanne, Marie, the Planter's daughters	sopranos	
Aurore, Hortense, Olive, Paulette, the Planter's daughters	altos	
Negro I	tenor	
Negro II	baritone	
Chorus of slaves, dancers, servants

== Synopsis ==
Place: Mississippi River plantation in Louisiana
Time: Second half of the 18th century.

=== Prologue ===
Uncle Joe is about to tell the tale of Koanga and Palmyra, at the request of the planters’ daughters.

=== Act 1 ===
Years earlier

Palmyra, the maid to Clotilda (the wife of the plantation owner Don José Martinez), watches Simon Perez, the plantation overseer, rouse up the slaves for their labours. Perez declares his love for Palmyra, but she brushes aside such sentiments. Martinez arrives, and Perez tells him of the arrival of a new slave. The new slave is Koanga, a captured African prince. Koanga invokes his gods to avenge his betrayal. Perez states that Koanga would rather die than be a slave, but Martinez suggests that Palmyra can be used to change his sentiments. Koanga and Palmyra are introduced, and become attracted to each other. Perez becomes angry at this turn of events. Clotilda is appalled at this herself, as Palmyra is her half-sister.

=== Act 2 ===
Preparations for the wedding of Koanga and Palmyra are taking place. Clotilda consults with Perez as to how to stop this wedding. Perez tells Palmyra the truth about her birth, but she remains determined to marry Koanga. Just as the wedding ceremony is about to occur, Perez kidnaps Palmyra. Koanga then fights with Martinez and prevails in the man-to-man struggle. Koanga escapes to the swamp and invokes magic to bring disease contagion to the plantation. However, he has a vision of Palmyra’s suffering, which causes him to return to the plantation. When he arrives, Perez is trying to embrace Palmyra. Koanga kills Perez, but is in turn captured and executed. Palmyra mourns for Koanga, and then takes her own life.

=== Epilogue ===
The planter's daughters respond to Uncle Joe’s story, as the sun rises.

== Recording ==
- EMI Classics 585 142 2 (2003 reissue): Eugene Holmes, Claudia Lindsey, Raimund Herincx, Keith Erwen, Jean Allister, Simon Estes; John Alldis Choir; London Symphony Orchestra; Sir Charles Groves, conductor. Recorded Kingsway Hall 19–26 September 1973.
