= In a Summer Garden =

Fantasia composed by Frederick Delius

Frederick Delius, photographed in 1907

In a Summer Garden is a fantasy for orchestra composed in 1908 by Frederick Delius; it was first performed in London under the composer's baton on 11 December of that year. The piece is built around several distinct themes. The first appears in the woodwinds and strings; the second is presented by the cor anglais, and the third is scored for violas against figures and chords in the woodwinds and lower strings. This is worked out vigorously before the piece is concluded by a new theme, first from the violins and repeated by the woodwinds.

The published score of the fantasy contains two quotations which provide some clue as to its emotional content. The first is a couplet by Dante Gabriel Rossetti:

All are my blooms; and all sweet blooms of love.
To thee I gave while Spring and Summer sang.

The origin of the second quote is unknown. It reads:

Roses, lilies, and a thousand scented flowers. Bright butterflies, flitting from petal to petal. Beneath the shade of ancient trees, a quiet river with water lilies. In a boat, almost hidden, two people. A thrush is singing in the distance.

The first broadcast performance was conducted by Edward Clark.

Philip Heseltine made a piano solo transcription in 1921, published only in 1982.
