= Summer Song =

Summer Song may refer to:

== Film and TV ==
- "Summer Song", a 1989 episode of The Wonder Years
- Summer Song, a 2011 film with Amy Jo Johnson

== Music ==
- Summer Song (musical), a 1956 musical based on the visit of the Czech composer Antonin Dvorak to Iowa
- Summer Song, for piano and oboe by Miguel del Águila
- Summer Song (album), a 2001 album by Mannheim Steamroller

=== Songs ===
- "Summer Song", a song by Dave Brubeck, from the album Jazz Impressions of the U.S.A.
- "Summersong", a 1962 song by Roy Orbison from the album Crying
- "A Summer Song", a 1964 song by Chad & Jeremy
- "Summer Song" (Joe Satriani song), 1992
- "Summersong", a 2006 song by The Decemberists from the album The Crane Wife
- "Summer Song" (Yui song), 2008
- "Summer Song", a 2011 single by Forever the Sickest Kids from the album Forever the Sickest Kids
- "Summer Song", a 2023 song by Theory of a Deadman from the album Dinosaur

== See also ==
- Summer Songs 2, a 2016 mixtape by Lil Yachty
- Song of the summer
- "Song of Summer", an episode of Omnibus, the BBC's television documentary series
- A Song of Summer, a tone poem by Frederick Delius
- "Song for the Summer", a 2015 song by Stereophonics
- Summer Music, a composition for wind quintet by Samuel Barber
