= Sea Drift =

Sea Drift may refer to:

- Sea-Drift, a section of Walt Whitman's poem Leaves of Grass
- Sea Drift (Carpenter), a tone poem inspired by the poem for orchestra composed by John Alden Carpenter in 1933
- Sea Drift (Delius), a choral setting of the poem composed by Frederick Delius in 1906
