= Bruce Boyce =

Canadian opera singer

Bruce Boyce (1910 – 11 May 1996) was a prominent Canadian-born American baritone singer of opera, oratorio and lieder, who made his postwar career in Britain and became a professor at the Royal Academy of Music.

== Early career ==
Born John Bruce McClaren in London, Ontario, Bruce Boyce was the son of a Canadian veterinary surgeon. His father was not musical, but his mother sang and gave him early encouragement. At a young age his family moved to Superior, Nebraska, in the American Midwest, where his singing came to the attention of a teacher interested in drama. He left school at 17 and went to California to seek his fortune, working in harvesting and other odd jobs. He began to save for study at Cornell University, where he began as a medical student; but after some time, while working at all-night car-washes where he sang to himself for pleasure, he transferred to an arts course to major in languages and music. Aware of his fine baritone voice, he joined the Cornell Glee Club and soon distinguished himself as a soloist in university recitals. In his last year he was invited to sing at the White House, entertaining presidential guests after dinner. During vacations, he sang in a professional quartet at a mountain resort. His success at Cornell led to his membership in the Quill and Dagger Society.

In 1934 he won a scholarship to study abroad, and given the prevailing fascist political climate of Germany and Italy decided to study in England, in London, with Reinhold von Warlich (also a teacher of John Goss and Pierre Bernac). Here he was introduced to lieder singing, and began to specialize in it. His first London recital was at Grotrian Hall in 1936, after which he gave recitals every year and made many appearances in oratorio performances and broadcasting. He also gave recitals in The Town Hall, in 1937 and 1938, where he was when Britain became involved in the war in 1939. He remained in the US, and when the U.S. entered the war he joined the United States Army Air Forces. He served the last years of the war in the U.S. Air Transport Headquarters, where he sang very little.

== Career recommenced ==
After demobilization, Boyce decided to base his home and career in London starting with two recitals at Wigmore Hall in 1946, after which he was soon re-established as a recitalist and oratorio singer. In 1947, he accepted the invitation to take part in the Italian opera season at the Cambridge Theatre. The venture collapsed, but not before he had distinguished himself as Don Giovanni (40 performances), Monterone in Rigoletto and Marcello in La bohème. He then went on to other roles, including Il conte in The Marriage of Figaro under Erich Kleiber at the Royal Opera House; he sang in the English Opera Group, the London Opera Club and continental Europe. Continuing his oratorio career, he often sang in J. S. Bach's St Matthew Passion and appeared in English music such as the Vaughan Williams' A Sea Symphony.

His recordings made a strong impression at the same time, especially in Sir Thomas Beecham's celebrated versions of Delius' (A Mass of Life (1953) and Sea Drift (1954). He sang in recordings of Purcell's Birthday Ode for the Queen and the Monteverdi Vespers of 1610 (Oiseau-Lyre), Bach's Mass in B minor (Enescu, with Kathleen Ferrier, Peter Pears, Norman Walker, an outstanding Hugo Wolf lieder record with Robert Veyron-Lacroix's electrifying piano accompaniments (Oiseau-Lyre) and in Baroque works such as Lully's Miserere, and Handel's Apollo e Dafne. But it was increasingly as a lieder singer that he was most highly esteemed. His lieder recitals were noted for their strong and intelligent construction and choice of material, and his singing for their roundness and firmness of tone, the flexibility and nuance of expression, and sureness of touch in mood-depiction. He was capable of bringing to life the wide emotional range of Schubert's lieder. Gerald Moore, who sometimes accompanied him on the piano, referred to him as "that immaculate artist", describing him as "a large, tall man", and stated that Boyce "is recognised in Germany today as echt deutsch with his superb enunciation and his knowledge of the literature." In addition to the above-cited Hugo Wolf lieder album, he did two others for Oiseau-Lyre, one of Schubert and one of Brahms. His a strong affection for British composers included not only Delius and Vaughan Williams but lesser lights such as Herbert Howells, John Ireland and Ivor Gurney.

He became a professor at the Royal Academy of Music in 1956.

He died on 11 May 1996 at Bishop Auckland, County Durham, England.

== Sources ==
- D. Brook, Singers of Today (Revd. Edn., Rockliff, London 1958), 33–37.
