= Sea-Drift =

Poem

"Sea-Drift" is the title of a section of Walt Whitman's major poetic work Leaves of Grass, first published in 1855. It is a compilation of poems referring to the sea or the sea-shore.

Sea-Drift follows the section titled A Broadway Pageant, and precedes the section By The Roadside.

The poems included in Sea-Drift are:

- Out of the Cradle Endlessly Rocking
- As I Ebb'd with the Ocean of Life
- Tears
- To the Man-of War Bird
- Aboard at a Ship's Helm
- On the Beach at Night
- The World Below the Brine
- On the Beach at Night Alone
- Song for All Seas, All Ships
- Patrolling Barnegat
- After the Sea-Ship

== Musical settings ==
Various works of 20th-century classical music have been inspired by the poems.

- Sea Drift. Frederick Delius set part of Out of the Cradle Endlessly Rocking for baritone solo, chorus and orchestra. It received its first performance in Germany (Essen, Tonkünstler-verein, Josef Loritz (baritone), cond. Georg Witte) in 1906, and its first British performance, sung by Frederic Austin and conducted by Henry J. Wood, in autumn 1908 at the Sheffield Festival.
- A Sea Symphony by Ralph Vaughan Williams. After an introduction ('Behold, the Sea Itself!' etc.), the text of A Song for All Seas, All Ships is taken up ('Today a rude brief recitative..'). The second movement takes as its text On the Beach at Night Alone. The poems of the last two movements are taken from elsewhere in Leaves of Grass. The Symphony was completed and published in 1909: the composer conducted the first performance at the Leeds Festival on 12 October 1910.
- Sea Drift. John Alden Carpenter wrote a tone poem of this name in 1933, which was premiered by the New York Philharmonic under Werner Janssen in 1934.
