= Virtual choir =

Choir whose members do not meet physically

A virtual choir, online choir or home choir is a choir whose members do not meet physically but who work together online from separate places. Some choirs just sing for the joy of the shared experience, while others record their parts alone and send their digital recordings, sometimes including video, to be collated into a choral performance. There may be a series of rehearsals which singers can watch online, and their performance recordings may be made while watching a video of the conductor, and in some cases listening to a backing track, to ensure unanimity of timing. The worldwide COVID-19 pandemic in 2020 inspired a large growth in the number of virtual choirs, although the idea was not new.

Online choirs can make singing accessible to would-be choristers who are unable to join 'in-person' or 'face-to-face' choirs due to issues such as disability, caring responsibilities, geographical restrictions, lack of local opportunities, cost, or a lack of confidence to perform or audition in front of others. For example those who use hearing aids may find it difficult to take part in a 'same-room' choir due to interference from multiple sources of sound, but could benefit from the more direct digital sound of an online choir rehearsal and/or the text-based chat offered by some online choirs.

== Eric Whitacre's Virtual Choir ==
American composer and conductor Eric Whitacre has led six iterations of his Virtual Choir, starting in 2009. He was inspired by a young singer Britlin Losee who contacted him after posting a YouTube recording of herself singing the soprano part of his work Sleep. In his first version, 185 singers from 12 countries sang his Lux Aurumque, watching a video of him conducting. By 2020, over 20,000 singers from 124 countries had participated in the choir, and Whitacre launched his Virtual Choir 6 to sing a new work "Sing Gently". 17,572 people in 129 countries had contributed their recordings by the closing date in May 2020.

== Virtual choirs during COVID-19 "lockdown" ==
Many virtual choirs were set up during the "lockdown" caused by the 2020 COVID-19 pandemic, when people could not meet to sing together.

ChoirCast was set up as Choirantine in April 2020 by Bristol-based singing teacher Eliza Fyfe, kick-starting with their debut "Bohemian Rhapsody" which featured Gareth Malone. ChoirCast have been producing monthly videos ever since, edited by Martin Elsbury, editor of Netflix documentary David Attenborough: A Life on Our Planet. They usually feature a band, with the sound mixed by music producers Daniel Edney, Kristian Bressington and Charles Grimsdale and popular song arrangements written by Eliza. This particular choir focuses on smaller numbers to enable singers to stand out more, even including soloists, yet still featuring people from all around the world.

The Collective Virtual Choir was set up in March 2020 by Simon Lubkowski, a Director of Music at a college in England. A prominent Barbershop singer and leader of several community based choirs in Leicestershire, Simon leads the choir from his garden shed studio along with his entirely voluntary Music Team who are based in the UK, Europe, USA, Canada and Australia. The choir stages daily rehearsals with sessions timed to suit different time zones, since the choir has almost 4,000 registered participants from 66 countries, alongside providing technical support and social events and activities via the medium of Zoom. The Collective produced its first song, White Cliffs of Dover, on 17 April 2020. Since then it has produced 23 further songs and a 27-song Christmas Show (The Collective and Friends at Christmas). The Collective is free to join and participate in. It runs daily rehearsals and, in addition, offers full technical support to its singers as well as social events/activities all via the medium of Zoom. The Collective Virtual Choir plans a Harmony College weekend (Free for registered singers), a Double CD Album and a Collective Live event in 2022.

In Australia, Couch Choir evolved from the pre-existing face-to-face Pub Choir with an "ongoing mission to bring strangers together for a sing-song", according to The Canberra Times. Since inception in March 2020, Couch Choir has chalked up millions of views with over 10,000 singers lending their voices to songs by Stevie Wonder, The Carpenters and David Bowie. Their July 2020 video of The Killers "All These Things That I've Done" included 1,534 contributions from people in 40 countries., and was shared by The Killers across social media. Couch Choir's videos have been featured on BBC News, Australian Story and Today.

Gareth Malone launched The Great British Home Chorus on Monday 23 March 2020 on YouTube and conducted 50 half-hour rehearsals (Monday-Friday with a "half term" break) up to Friday 12 June, moving thereafter to weekly rehearsals. He worked from his garden studio, with technical assistance from Decca Record. The choir produced a CD including the voices of 11,000 singers, featuring the songs "You Are My Sunshine", Duran Duran's "Ordinary World", Keane's "Somewhere Only We Know" and Elton John's "I'm Still Standing", accompanied by members of the London Symphony Orchestra.

In March 2020, U.S. music student Harrison Sheckler organized 300 singers and musicians from 15 countries and created a music video of the show tune “You’ll Never Walk Alone,” from the 1945 Rodgers and Hammerstein musical Carousel. It was viewed more than 1.5 million times on YouTube.

Quarantine Choir (now Homechoir) was launched in March 2020 by Ben England, a choral director, conductor and music teacher from Bristol, with the original intention of keeping his face-to-face choir members singing during lockdown. The choir has since attracted thousands of singers from around the world, and Ben was awarded a British Empire Medal in the 2020 Birthday Honours for services to the community during COVID-19. Homechoir broadcasts sessions live on YouTube four days a week, teaching a wide range of music, including traditional choral and classical, folk, gospel, sea shanties, children’s songs and silly songs. Ben also teaches a series of short 'Deep Dive' lectures on topics such as music theory, history and composing. Homechoir's singers have recorded several video and audio performances from home, mixed by Ben and streamed on the channel.

The Self-Isolation Choir (now Choir of the Earth) was launched in March 2020 by businessman Mark Strachan, with Musical Director Ben England, and initially worked towards a performance of Handel’s Messiah. The production included 3,600 voices, 4 professional soloists, and a 9-member baroque orchestra, who all recorded their parts in isolation, and the final, studio-mixed performance was broadcast on Sunday 31 May 2020. Within its first year, the choir ran 30 courses, covering a wide range of classical and contemporary choral works and, as at July 2021, had more than 6,000 members. In February 2021, Ben England conducted a "world tour" of Mendelssohn's Elijah, performing the choir's concert performance three times in one day for different time zones. On 29 April 2021, more than 1,000 SIC members performed in All Things Bright and Virtual, a celebration of hymns directed by Ralph Allwood and featuring Stephen Fry, Bryn Terfel, Libby Purves, John Rutter, Alexander Armstrong, Katherine Jenkins, Wynne Evans, and Harry Christophers. On 31 May 2021, SIC celebrated the anniversary of its first performance with a completely new recording of Handel's Messiah, dubbing it "Hallelujah Day". On 9 April 2021, SIC released its first single, Miserere, directed by Nigel Short, and donated all profits to The Duke of Edinburgh's Award in honour of Prince Philip, Duke of Edinburgh, who died on that day. The choir later recorded Prince Philip's favourite hymn, "Eternal Father, Strong to Save", and presented its performance to Queen Elizabeth II on 10 June 2021 to commemorate what would have been her late husband's 100th birthday.

The Sofa Singers was founded by choir leader and performer James Sills in March 2020, with global members meeting twice a week on Zoom to sing together. The music covered is primarily pop and motown classics from the 1960s to more contemporary hits. Each session finishes with an open mic opportunity, where singers can share with others around the world, for example music, poetry, arts, craft, or their pets. In May 2020, James was awarded a Points Of Light award in recognition of his work to help combat feelings of isolation during the pandemic through his work with the Sofa Singers.

The Stay at Home Choir was founded in mid March 2020 by conductor Tori Longdon and baritone Jamie Wright. During the pandemic, the Choir worked recorded projects with professional musicians including The King's Singers, The Sixteen, The Swingles, Marin Alsop, John Rutter, the Royal Philharmonic Orchestra, Voces8 and Christopher Tin. Its largest and one of its longest projects to date, in collaboration with Classic FM, was Karl Jenkins's The Armed Man, which premiered in August 2020. Stay At Home Choir received one of the first Royal Philharmonic Society Awards for Inspiration in November 2020.

== Virtual choral activities by existing choirs during the pandemic ==
During the COVID-19 pandemic some existing choirs developed innovative ways to rehearse or perform together remotely.

The Melbourne Symphony Orchestra's virtual choir recorded "Waltzing Matilda" for the annual Anzac Day commemoration at which the MSO Chorus would normally have performed.

The Rexburg Children's Choir in Rexburg, Idaho, United States, featured on NBC Nightly News with Lester Holt with their virtual performance of For Unto Us a Child is Born. Each of the 100 singers, aged 10 to 17, came individually to a central location to sing, conducted by director Ben Watson, in front of a green screen, and these films were combined to show the whole choir apparently singing together. Inside Edition highlighted the virtual choral performance as part of their national broadcast the following day.

Software was developed aimed specifically at school choirs, so that pupils isolated at home could sing together.

== Virtual choirs after the pandemic ==
Several online choirs established during the COVID-19 pandemic announced their intentions to continue to deliver online choral singing after the end of lockdown restrictions.

=== Choir of the Earth ===
On 16 July 2021, The Self-Isolation Choir's Founder, Mark Strachan, announced the choir's rebranding as Choir of the Earth - a name intended to reflect its post-pandemic future, global presence and commitment to environmentally-friendly singing. He also announced the choir's first online Festival of Choral Music in early November 2021, featuring teaching and conversations with John Warner, Ralph Allwood, Harry Bradford, Ellie Slorach, Nigel Short, Joanna Forbes L’Estrange, Ben England, Donald Palumbo, Ashley Riches, Helen Charlston, Patrick Hawes, Marina Mahler, and more.

As well as a wide repertoire of choral singing courses, Choir of the Earth also offers historical lectures, singing skills courses and 'In Conversation With' interviews with key figures in the choral world through its Around Sound series. In November 2021, journalist, presenter and author John Suchet led a series of Around Sound talks on Ludwig van Beethoven.

In October 2021, guest director Nigel Short led over 2,000 voices in a performance of 40-part choral motet Spem in Alium by Thomas Tallis. The Choir produced a video to accompany its performance, which simultaneously shows Nigel Short conducting each of the 40 parts individually.

In December 2021, Musical Director Ben England conducted the Choir in a special broadcast of Handel's Messiah from the Foundling Museum in London.

In January 2022, the Choir's Founder, Mark Strachan, received a British Empire Medal in the New Year Honours List 2022 for his work with the Choir and its charitable services to musicians during the COVID-19 pandemic.

On 9 February 2022, Choir of the Earth performed Symphony No. 8 by Gustav Mahler under the direction of conductor John Warner and in partnership with the Mahler Foundation and the Orchestra for the Earth. The performance included 1,200 vocal parts, including the children's choir of the Conservatorio Gustav Mahler in Irapuato, Mexico and soloists from Sansara Choir, and is believed to the only performance of this large-scale work to ever be recorded, mixed and performed remotely.

Choir of the Earth partnered with the Royal School of Church Music for its Music Sunday celebrations in both 2021 and 2022, performing the competition-winning anthem God Of All Creation by Chris Totney under the direction of the RSCM's Director Hugh Morris on 6 June 2021, and performing an online Evensong service with the Choral Evensong Trust under the direction of Ralph Allwood on 12 June 2022.

In May 2022, Choir of the Earth partnered with international conductor Saul Zaks to publicise the story and music of Shchedryk children's choir, the children of which had been displaced by the 2022 Russian invasion of Ukraine. With the aim of sharing Shchedryk's music with the world, Saul, Choir of the Earth and a small international team established a recording project where choirs and individuals worldwide could learn and record one of Shchedryk's recently recorded pieces - a lullaby called Ходить зайчик ("The Bunny Walks"). On 15 June 2022, Choir of the Earth premiered the final performance of The Bunny Walks, conducted by Saul Zaks, which featured 2,000 vocal submissions from singers around the world.

On 2 June 2022, Choir of the Earth premiered its performance of God Save The Queen - a new arrangement by Ralph Allwood, featuring a new third verse written for the Platinum Jubilee of Elizabeth II by poet Alexandra Brooke and accompanied by Luke Bond on the organ at St George's Chapel, Windsor Castle. The performance, featuring over 2,500 vocal recordings, was commercially released as a single by Pretty Decent Music on 3 June 2022.

As of July 2022, the Choir has run over 80 online courses, with plans for more to come in 2022 and beyond.

In May 2022, Choir of the Earth announced its foray into live events via a Messiah 'Come and Sing' Tour, with initial dates and venues across the UK and Ireland, starting in London on 22 October 2022 and ending in Belfast on 15 April 2023. The Choir hopes to take the Messiah Tour to further international locations in 2023/24.

Throughout summer and autumn 2022, Musical Director Ben England will lead Choir of the Earth through intense rehearsals of A Mass Of Life by Frederick Delius ahead of a ground-breaking, hybrid live/online performance of the work alongside the Bergen Philharmonic Orchestra and Chorus, led by chorus master Håkon Matti Skrede, and conducted by Mark Elder. The live element will be recorded at the Norwegian premiere of A Mass Of Life on 22–23 September 2022, with the hybrid performance incorporating the digitally recorded singers to be screened in late 2022.

=== Homechoir ===
In July 2021, Homechoir's Founder and Musical Director, Ben England, confirmed it would continue with four sessions per week beyond lockdown.

As well as its usual singing and teaching sessions, Homechoir has also established an ongoing series of free online singing projects using a unique approach to recording and mixing called Sing & Send.

On 5 June 2022, Homechoir partnered with St George's Bristol, Bristol Choral Society, City of Bristol Brass Band, the Fitzhardinge Consort and members of the public to perform a mass rendition of the Hallelujah Chorus from Handel's Messiah in a flash mob in Bristol to celebrate the Platinum Jubilee of Queen Elizabeth II.

On 26 June 2022, Homechoir performed Sanctus from Fauré's Requiem as the official choir performance for the inaugural Celebration Day.

Ben's work with Homechoir has led to him receiving the 2021 Kantele of the Year award from the Finnish Kantele Association, the 2022 Alumni Award for Community Engagement and Impact from the University of Bristol, and being shortlisted as a Finalist for the Francesca Hanley Inspiration Award at the 2022 Music and Drama Education Awards.

=== The Sofa Singers ===
The Sofa Singers continues to meet twice weekly on Zoom, aiming to "spark joy and human connection" through singing together. The sessions are co-hosted by choir leader, performer and author James Sills and singer-songwriter, choir leader and vocal tutor Mersey Wylie, daughter of Pete Wylie.

The group was featured in a special Royal Carols: Together at Christmas carol service hosted by Catherine, Duchess of Cambridge at Westminster Abbey and broadcast on ITV on Christmas Eve 2021.

=== Stay at Home Choir ===
The Stay At Home Choir has called itself "a virtual choir for all time". The choir holds interactive rehearsals and technical webinars using Zoom, which are recorded and archived to its private website for members. In March 2022, there was a registered membership of more than 29,000 singers.

Since pandemic restrictions ended in July 2021, Stay at Home Choir has continued to run projects with professional musicians such as Gareth Malone, Morten Lauridsen, the Vienna Radio Symphony Orchestra, I Fagiolini, The Swingles, Simon Carrington, Choralspace Festival Chorus and Frode Fjellheim. Finished project recordings are published on YouTube.

Stay at Home Choir released its first album in November 2021 and is recording a second album during summer/autumn 2022.

== Mental health effects ==
Researchers from University College London investigated the effect of virtual choirs on mental health and it is reported that "participants not only felt happier and experienced a noticeable boost in their self-esteem, but also reduced feelings of social isolation".
