= Francis Grier =

English composer and psychoanalyst (b1955)

- Born: Francis John Roy Grier; 29 July 1955 (age 70); Kota Kinabalu, Malaysia
- Occupations: Composer, psychoanalyst
- Employer(s): British Psychoanalytical Society, Tavistock Clinic

Francis John Roy Grier (born 29 July 1955 in Kota Kinabalu, Malaysia) is an English classical composer and psychoanalyst.

== Music ==
Francis Grier's musical journey began at St George's Chapel, Windsor Castle, where he served as a chorister. He later became the first music scholar at Eton College and went on to be an organ scholar at King's College, Cambridge. During this period he worked under Joseph Cooper, Fanny Waterman and Bernard Roberts, Sidney Campbell and Gillian Weir.

Following his studies at Cambridge, where he worked under Sir David Willcocks and Philip Ledger at King's, he joined Christ Church Cathedral, Oxford, as Simon Preston's assistant. In 1981, at the age of 25, he succeeded Preston as Organist and Tutor in Music. During this time, he recorded numerous pieces and performed on BBC TV and radio as both an organist and chamber music pianist. Additionally, Grier commissioned contemporary composers to create new works for the choir.

Throughout his career, Grier has been commissioned to compose works for various cathedral and collegiate foundations. Notably, he created a setting of Psalm 150 as a birthday gift for Queen Elizabeth II in 1996, which was performed at St George's Chapel, Windsor Castle. He also composed a new piece for the 'Choirbook for the Queen' in celebration of the Diamond Jubilee.

In 2012 he won a British Composer Award, and was commissioned to write new works for both the Worshipful Company of Musicians and the Rodolfus Choir. Recent recordings of his work have included Lit by Holy Fire by the choir of King’s College Cambridge, recordings of his organ music by Tom Winpenny in St Alban’s Cathedral and Stephen Farr in Merton College, Oxford. 2023 also saw a recording of three carols for a CD of Christmas music sung by the choir of the Chapel Royal, Hampton Court.

The Grier Trio consists of Savitri (violin) and Indira (cello) playing with their father, Francis Grier (piano). They have played at St John's, Smith Square and at the Fairfield Halls, Croydon, as well as in the Blackheath Halls concert series, and they have regularly performed at St Mary's, Perivale and at Bob Boas’ concert series. In 2016 they played at All Souls, Oxford, and in the Holywell Music Room for the Oxford Chamber Music Society. In 2017 they performed the Beethoven Triple Concerto in the Chapel of King's College, Cambridge, with the Cambridge University Chamber Orchestra directed by Stephen Cleobury.

== Psychoanalysis ==
Francis Grier was appointed editor-in-chief of the International Journal of Psychoanalysis in 2022, and is a Training Analyst and Supervisor of the British Psychoanalytical Society. He is also a couple psychotherapist. He works in private practice in London and leads a seminar for the psychotherapists in the Fitzjohn's Unit of the Tavistock Clinic, which specialises in working psychoanalytically with patients who would not normally have access to psychoanalytic treatment. He has written and edited papers, chapters and two books on couple psychotherapy, including Oedipus and the Couple (2005), and papers for the IJP on two Verdi operas (Rigoletto and La Traviata), on a gendered approach to Beethoven, on musicality in the consulting room, and on the music of the drives and perversions.

Cultural offices
Preceded by Simon Preston	Organist and Master of the Choristers of Christ Church Cathedral, Oxford; 1981–1985	Succeeded by Stephen Darlington
Preceded by Dana Birksted Breen	Editor-in-chief of The International Journal of Psychoanalysis; 2022-Present	
