= Sea Drift (Delius) =

Musical composition by Frederick Delius

Frederick Delius, photographed in 1907

Sea Drift is among the larger-scale musical works by the composer Frederick Delius. Completed in 1903–04 and first performed in 1906, it is a setting for baritone, chorus and orchestra of words by Walt Whitman.

== The poem adaptation ==
Sea Drift takes its name from a section of Walt Whitman's poetical compilation Leaves of Grass, Sea-Drift, which contains several poems about the sea or the shore. The text is drawn from the poem Out of the Cradle Endlessly Rocking, though it does not use the full text. In the poem, the speaker describes how, as a boy, he watched a pair of mocking-birds nesting, until one day the she-bird flew away and never returned. In a long section usually printed in italics, the he-bird, unable to leave in case his mate should return and find him gone, waits forever and calls his sorrowful song to the moon, the stars and the sea, which are heavy and drooping with his lost love.

The text employed by Delius closes with the bird's apostrophe, 'translated' by the boy, who seems to understand it, or projects it from his own awakening feelings. The poem however continues to explain how the boy's feelings suddenly burst out tumultuously, and he ran weeping down to the sea in the moonlight as the bird's call unlocked the questions in his own heart. Knowing that he will never escape the unknown want aroused in him, 'the sweet hell within', he begs for some word more of understanding. The unhurrying sea

Lisp'd to me the low and delicious word death,
And again death, death, death, death
Hissing melodious, neither like the bird nor like my arous'd child's heart,
But edging near as privately for me rustling at my feet,
Creeping thence steadily up to my ears and laving me softly all over,
Death, death, death, death, death.

== The setting ==
Throughout the work, which lasts about 25 minutes, the motion of the waves is suggested by the orchestra. The chorus opens (the beginning of the poem, 'Out of the cradle...' is omitted) at 'Once Paumanok, when the lilac-scent was in the air...', two sections weaving the words to suggest the two birds. Then the baritone is the narrator, and tells ('And every day...') how the boy went and watched, and the chorus responds with the birds singing together ('Shine! shine! shine!'). The baritone interrupts ('Till of a sudden...') to tell how the she-bird disappeared, and the he-bird was left. The chorus gives the bird's cry, and the baritone responds with the lyrical passage describing how the boy listened to the song, 'Yes my brother, I know: The rest might not, but I have treasured every note...'

The remainder of the setting is from the text of the bird's song (somewhat edited), (beginning 'Soothe! soothe! soothe!') overlapping as the baritone sings 'Following you, my brother...': from this point on the baritone takes important sections of the bird's song ('You must know who I am, my love!'), with the chorus singing other parts of the text at the same time, interweaving, reinforcing, echoing and punctuating the singer's narrative. Love becomes the power which drives the effects of nature ('O madly the sea pushes upon the land,/With love, with love'). The choral phrases 'O rising stars! Perhaps the one I want so much will rise, will rise with some of you' pivots between two passages where despair alternates with the delusional hope for a glimpse or an echo of the beloved. This culminates in the fortissimo 'O in vain!', repeated by the chorus as the climax, and then the long coda, mainly sung by the baritone ('O I am very sick and sorrowful'), lamenting the loss of their life together ('We two together no more'), and the words 'no more', echoed like the murmuring sea and wind by the choir, bring the work to a close.

By this blending of the narrator with the choir in the words of the bird's song, Delius has achieved the union of the boy's spirit with what he witnesses, in the way that is explained in the later part of Whitman's poem, and Delius does not have to tell us about the 'low and delicious word death.'

== Premier performances ==
Sea Drift was completed by Delius between 1903 and 1904, not long before his A Mass of Life. It was dedicated to the composer and conductor Max von Schillings (then plain "Max Schillings"), and (at a time when Delius found it very difficult to obtain performances of his works in Britain) the first performance was given on 24 May 1906 at the Essen Tonkünstler Verein (Composers' Society) in Germany, with Joseph Loritz as soloist and Georg Witte conducting. Carl Schuricht was present, was immediately won over by the work, and wrote frequently to the composer about it. Over the next years the bass Felix von Kraus distinguished himself in the work in Germany.

The first performance in England was given by the baritone Frederic Austin, conducted by Henry Wood, in autumn 1908 at the Sheffield Festival. It was repeated, with the same soloist and with the New Symphony Orchestra and the North Staffordshire Choral Society, under Thomas Beecham, at Hanley, Staffordshire on 3 December 1908 and at Manchester on 4 December. Of this Manchester performance it was written, "People had come from Paris, London, Birmingham and Liverpool to hear it; yet, as a matter of actual fact, there were more people taking part in the concert on the platform than listeners in the audience. Nevertheless, Delius's Sea Drift aroused tremendous enthusiasm, the audience making up in applause what they lacked in numbers."

The New York premiere, in 1928, featured the English baritone Herbert Heyner.

=== Recordings ===
The first commercial recording of Sea Drift was issued in 1929 by Decca Records. The set of three 78rpm discs featured baritone Roy Henderson with the New English Symphony Orchestra and Chorus; however, the recording was pulled by Decca after a limited time (before 1936) because it fitted poorly across six record sides, and on account of contract issues related to the conductor (who went unnamed on the recording). An earlier recording was made in 1928 for His Master's Voice of baritone Dennis Noble, the London Symphony Orchestra and the Manchester Beecham Opera Chorus under Sir Thomas Beecham; however, His Master's Voice never issued the recording owing to flawed acoustics. It was eventually released as part of an anthology of Beecham recordings in 2001.

Beecham recorded Sea Drift a few more times, beginning in 1936 with John Brownlee and the London Philharmonic Orchestra and London Select Choir, for special release by the Delius Society (and reissued in 1976 for World Record Club). Then in January 1951 he conducted baritone Gordon Clinton, the BBC Chorus and the Royal Philharmonic Orchestra. Lastly came a rendition with Bruce Boyce (and the same orchestra and choir) recorded in 1954 and widely released by CBS Masterworks and Philips Classics.

A 1963 broadcast performance (in German) conducted by Carl Schuricht, with soloist Carlos Alexander and the Bavarian Radio Orchestra, preserves the reading of one of the earliest conductors of the work, who knew Delius and altered some details of his orchestration. Later recordings include Sir Charles Groves conducting the Royal Liverpool Philharmonic Orchestra & Choir with John Noble (paired with A Song of the High Hills on Angel Records in 1974), and Richard Hickox leading the Royal Philharmonic Orchestra with the London Symphony Chorus and John Shirley-Quirk (a 1981 pairing with Appalachia on Argo). Digital recordings of the work are found on the 1991 CD of Thomas Hampson with the Welsh National Opera Orchestra & Chorus under Sir Charles Mackerras; a 1993 rendition by Bryn Terfel with the Bournemouth Symphony Orchestra and assorted choirs, again under Hickox and released on Chandos Records, and a 2013 recording by Roderick Williams with the Hallé Orchestra, Hallé Choir and Hallé Youth Choir conducted by Mark Elder.

In 2012, at the behest of the Delius Trust, a new recording of Sea Drift was made (paired again with Appalachia). Intended to commemorate the 150th anniversary of Delius' 1862 birth, while also honoring the connection he had to Florida, the album features baritone Leon Williams with The Florida Orchestra and The Master Chorale of Tampa Bay, under conductor Stefan Sanderling. Naxos Records recorded the live album during concerts in St. Petersburg, Florida.
