= Rodolfus Choir =

The Rodolfus Choir was founded by Ralph Allwood in 1984. It is a choir of singers aged 16-23 which is part of the Rodolfus Choral Foundation. Many members have previously taken part in Rodolfus Choral Courses (formerly the Eton Choral Courses), though membership of the choir is open to all via auditions every August. The choir has toured extensively in the UK and abroad, and on top of performances at such venues as St John's, Smith Square and the Three Choirs Festival in Gloucester they have produced a considerable discography of music ranging from Monteverdi to Grier.

The name is derived from the Latin form of the name Ralph, Rudolphus.

== Discography ==
- Francis Grier: A Sequence for the Ascension - 1992 - Herald/Signum Records
- Mater, Ora Filium: Choral Music by Bax and Villette - 1995 - Herald/Signum Records
- Among the Leaves So Green: English and Scottish Folk Songs - 1995 - Herald/Signum Records
- Francis Grier: Twelve Anthems - 1996 - Herald/Signum Records
- Parry: Songs of Farewell - 1998 - Herald/Signum Records
- Eberlin: Sacred Choral Music - 2000 - ASV
- By Special Arrangement - 2000 - Herald/Signum Records
- A Christmas Collection - 2003 - Herald/Signum Records
- Thomas Tallis: Latin and English motets and anthems - 2004 - Herald/Signum Records
- Abendlied: German Romantic Motets - 2004 - Herald/Signum Records
- Monteverdi Vespers of 1610 - 2007 - Signum Records
- Choral Arrangements by Clytus Gottwald - 2007 - Signum Records
- Herbert Howells: Choral Music - 2010 - Signum Records
- Bach: Mass in B minor - 2010 - Signum Records
- A Choral Christmas - 2011 - Signum Records
- Edward Elgar: Go, Song of Mine - 2012 - Signum Records
- ...the flowers have their angels: Paul Mealor & Benjamin Britten - 2013 - Signum Records
- Daniel Purcell: The Judgment of Paris - 2014 - Resonus
- Time and Tts Passing - 2015 - Signum Records
- Guiding Light, Katherine Jenkins - 2018 - Decca
- Choral Music by John Tavener & Francis Grier - 2021 - Rodolfus
- Cecilia McDowall: A Tree is a Song - Secular Choral Works - 2026 - Signum Records
