= Eric Fenby =

British composer (1906–1997)

Fenby (left) and Yehudi Menuhin holding a Delius score

Eric William Fenby OBE (22 April 1906 – 18 February 1997) was an English composer, conductor, pianist, organist and teacher, born in Scarborough, Yorkshire. He is best known for being Frederick Delius's amanuensis from 1928 to 1934. He helped Delius realise a number of works that would not otherwise have been forthcoming as the composer was too ill to write them down, and between them they devised a way for Fenby to take dictation from Delius.

After Delius died in 1934, Fenby worked with Sir Thomas Beecham on a production of Delius's opera Koanga at Covent Garden and then became a music adviser to the London publishing house Boosey & Hawkes, where he introduced the young Benjamin Britten to the company. From 1964 to 1977 he was professor of harmony at the Royal Academy of Music in London.

Fenby composed music of his own, including the film score for Alfred Hitchcock's 1939 Jamaica Inn, but he was intensely self-critical and destroyed most of his compositions. He retired to his native Scarborough, where he died aged ninety.

== Life and career ==
=== Early years ===
Fenby was born in Scarborough, Yorkshire, on 22 April 1906, the only son and eldest of three children of Herbert Henry Fenby – an engineer – and his wife, Ada, née Brown. His exceptional musical talent – including perfect pitch and a fine treble voice – was apparent from his early years. At the age of twelve he was appointed organist at Holy Trinity Church, Scarborough. At sixteen he was articled to the leading organist of the district, Claude Keaton. His various musical skills were soon in demand, accompanying singers and rehearsing local choral societies and amateur orchestras. Alick Maclean, conductor of the Spa Orchestra, recognizing his talent, invited him to conduct his early compositions, giving him his first contact with professional players. During the summer Scarborough season Maclean had at his disposal the finest players from regional orchestras, who were not then on year-round contracts to the Hallé, Scottish and other ensembles.

== Working for Delius ==
In 1928, hearing that Frederick Delius had become virtually helpless because of blindness and paralysis (a result of syphilis), Fenby offered to serve him as an amanuensis. Delius replied, "I was greatly touched by your kind and sympathetic letter and I should love to accept your offer". Fenby worked at the composer's home in Grez-sur-Loing, near Fontainebleau, for extended periods until Delius died almost six years later. The project was taxing because of the need to devise a unique mode of musical communication so that Fenby could put on paper the music still in the composer's head but which his physical condition now prevented him writing down. The musicologist Christopher Palmer has described Fenby's completion from dictation of such scores as A Song of Summer and Songs of Farewell as "an achievement without parallel in music".

The works Fenby helped Delius to write are:

- A Late Lark (tenor and orchestra)
- A Song of Summer (orchestra)
- Caprice and Elegy (cello and chamber orchestra)
- Cynara (baritone and orchestra)
- Fantastic Dance (orchestra – dedicated to Fenby)
- Idyll (soprano, baritone and orchestra)
- Irmelin Prelude (orchestra)
- Songs of Farewell (double choir and orchestra)
- Violin Sonata No. 3 (violin and piano)

Although born into a Methodist household, Fenby had become a practising Roman Catholic and at one point even considered becoming a Benedictine monk. He suffered much from Delius's militant atheism and difficult temperament. The strain on him was intensified by the necessity of acting as nurse during the composer's final days. Shortly before his death Delius showed his gratitude for Fenby's selfless devotion by giving him his treasured gold watch and chain. He bequeathed him his Ibach grand piano and HMV horn gramophone. Delius died in Fenby's arms on 10 June 1934.

Further responsibilities followed, including visiting Delius's severely ill widow, Jelka, and accompanying the composer's exhumed body back to England for permanent burial. The whole experience left him exhausted. At the urging of the music critic Ernest Newman he wrote an account of his time with the composer, Delius As I Knew Him, published in 1936. (Note: This episode in Fenby's and Delius's lives was portrayed in Ken Russell's 1968 BBC Television film, Song of Summer.)

== Later career ==
After Delius's death Fenby assisted Sir Thomas Beecham with the 1935 Covent Garden production of the composer's opera Koanga. After that he became a consultant to the music publisher Boosey & Hawkes, who had published all the works Delius had dictated to him. It was Fenby who introduced the young Benjamin Britten to the company; Britten remained with the publisher until 1964. Through the Laughton family in Scarborough, Fenby knew Charles Laughton, star of Alfred Hitchcock's Jamaica Inn (1939), and was engaged to write the film score. His cinema career was halted by the Second World War. After joining the Royal Artillery he was transferred to the Education Corps at Bulford, where he conducted the Southern Command Orchestra. He was later commissioned to run Royal Army Education Corps courses in Lancashire.

In 1944 Fenby married Rowena Marshall, the daughter of a Scarborough vicar. They had a son, Roger, and a daughter, Ruth. After the war Fenby founded the music department of the North Riding Training College. After Beecham's death in 1961 Fenby succeeded him as artistic director of the Delius Festival held in Bradford in 1962; he was awarded the OBE for his work in this capacity. At the instigation of Sir Thomas Armstrong, principal of the Royal Academy of Music in London, Fenby was appointed professor of harmony, serving from 1964 to 1977.

In 1972 Fenby joined the committee of the Royal Philharmonic Society, and was made an honorary member of the society in 1984. He received honorary doctorates from the Universities of Bradford and Warwick, and Jacksonville in Florida, and honorary fellowships or memberships of the Royal Academy of Music, the Royal College of Music and Trinity College of Music. He was president of both the Delius Society in London and the Delius Association of Florida. He conducted at the 24th annual Delius Festival in Jacksonville in 1984.

To mark Fenby's ninetieth birthday, Stephen Lloyd edited Fenby on Delius, which comprised Fenby's articles, transcripts of his talks, and his studies of the composer's works for orchestra, solo instrument and orchestra, voices and orchestra, solo voice, chamber ensembles and the stage.

In his final years Fenby moved back to Scarborough, where he died, approaching his 91st birthday. He is buried with his wife, Rowena, in the churchyard of St Laurence's Church, Scalby, a village on the north edge of Scarborough.

== Recordings and films ==
As a conductor and pianist Fenby made several recordings. To mark his 75th birthday he recorded for Unicorn Records The Fenby Legacy, a double album comprising all the orchestral works he had taken down from Delius's dictation. He conducted other Delius works on disc, including Dance Rhapsody No. 2 (1986), "La Calinda" from Koanga (in his arrangement, 1981), the Intermezzo from Fennimore and Gerda, Cynara and An Arabesque (with Thomas Allen, 1981 and 1986) and Caprice and Elegy (with Lloyd Webber, 1981) He recorded all three of Delius's violin sonatas, first with Ralph Holmes (1972), and later with Yehudi Menuhin (1980). He recorded Delius's Cello Sonata with Julian Lloyd Webber (1981).

As a pianist – playing the Ibach grand piano left to him by Delius – Fenby accompanied Felicity Lott, Sarah Walker and Anthony Rolfe Johnson in a 1982 recording of sixteen songs by the composer for voice and piano: "Twilight Fancies", "The Violet", "In the Garden of the Seraglio", "Silken Shoes", "Autumn", "Young Venevil", "Irmelin Rose", "Let Springtime Come", "Pleure dans mon coeur", "Le del est, par-dessus le toit", "La lune blanche", "Chanson d'automne", "Avant que to ne t'en ailles", "To Daffodils", "So white, so soft, so sweet is she" and "I-Brasil". The following year he recorded nine orchestral songs by Delius in 1983, with the same three singers and the Royal Philharmonic Orchestra: "Twilight Fancies", "Wine Roses", "The Bird's Story", "Let Springtime Come", "II pleure dans mon coeur", "Le del est, par-dessus le toit", "La lune blanche", "To Daffodils" (orchestrated by Fenby) and "I-Brasil".

Fenby was adviser to Ken Russell for the 1968 film Song of Summer, in which Fenby is portrayed by Christopher Gable (with too broad a Yorkshire accent for Fenby's liking). He was also the focus of a 1981 documentary film by Yorkshire Television called Song of Farewell, in which he revisited Grez-sur-Loing.

== Works ==
Fenby was always a severe self-critic: he said, "In music talent is not enough. You must be a genius". He destroyed several substantial early works but the following smaller pieces survive.

=== Orchestral works ===
- Overture "Rossini on Ilkla Moor" (1938)
- Slow march "Lion Limb" (1952)
- "Two Aquarelles"

=== Choral works ===
- Magnificat and Nunc Dimittis (1932)
- "For music on the eve of Palm Sunday" (1933, words by Robert Nichols)

=== Books ===
- Delius as I Knew Him, 1936. Revised edition, 1966. New revised edition, 1981.
- Delius (1974).

== Notes, references and sources ==
=== Sources ===
- Carpenter, Humphrey (1992). Benjamin Britten. New York: Charles Scribner's Sons. ISBN 0-684-19569-0.
- Jenkins, Lyndon (2009). Delius Violin Sonatas. Hong Kong: Naxos. OCLC 847750225.
- Lloyd, Stephen, ed. (Spring 1986). "Before and After Grez". Journal of The Delius Society. OCLC 1296358441.
- Lloyd, Stephen (2012). The Delius Collection. London: Heritage Records. OCLC 917156199.
- Threlfall, Robert (1977). A Catalogue of the Compositions of Frederick Delius. London: Delius Trust. OCLC 0851620280.
