= Dick Bush =

British cinematographer (1931–1997)

- Born: Richard Henry Bush; 24 June 1931; Devonport, Plymouth, United Kingdom
- Died: 4 August 1997 (aged 65); West Devon, United Kingdom
- Occupation: Cinematographer
- Years active: 1964 – 1995

Richard Henry Bush (24 June 1931 – 4 August 1997) was a prolific British cinematographer whose career spanned over thirty years. Among his films are Ken Russell's Savage Messiah (1972), Mahler (1974) and Tommy (1975), John Schlesinger's Yanks (1979), and a number of films directed by Blake Edwards.

After attending Plymouth Art College, he was called up to serve in the Royal Military Police as an Officer after which he had various jobs, including working for Fry's Chocolate, and Clarks Shoes, where he began producing promotional films. This eventually landed him a job at the BBC in 1961, where he became part of the early outside broadcasting team and went with Malcolm Muggeridge to film the Holy Land. While never leaving television totally, he started working with feature films already in 1968.

He won a BAFTA TV Award for Individual Honour in 1967, and in 1980, he was nominated for a BAFTA for Best Cinematography for Yanks. In 1982, he was nominated for a similar award by the British Society of Cinematographers for Victor Victoria. And in 1996, he was nominated for a Gemini Award for Best Photography in a Dramatic Program or Mini-Series for The Man in the Attic.

== Selected filmography ==
- Culloden (1964)
- Alice in Wonderland (1966)
- Song of Summer (1968)
- Whistle and I'll Come to You (BBC TV drama, 1968)
- When Dinosaurs Ruled the Earth (1970)
- The Blood on Satan's Claw (1971)
- Twins of Evil (1971)
- Dracula AD 1972 (1972)
- Savage Messiah (1972)
- Mahler (1974)
- Phase IV (1974)
- Tommy (1975)
- Clouds of Glory (TV film, 1976)
- Sorcerer (1977)
- The Legacy (1978)
- Yanks (1979)
- One Trick Pony (1980)
- The Fan (1981)
- Victor Victoria (1982)
- Trail of the Pink Panther (1982)
- Curse of the Pink Panther (1983)
- The Philadelphia Experiment (1984)
- The Journey of Natty Gann (1985)
- The Quick and the Dead (TV movie, 1987)
- The Lair of the White Worm (1988)
- Little Monsters (1989)
- Switch (1991)
- Son of the Pink Panther (1993)
- Ultimate Betrayal (TV movie, 1994)
- The Man in the Attic (TV movie, 1995)
