= A Song of the High Hills =

1911 composition by Frederick Delius

Frederick Delius, photographed in 1907

A Song of the High Hills is a work for tenor, soprano, chorus and orchestra by Frederick Delius. Composed in 1911, it was first performed under the direction of Albert Coates, at the Queen's Hall in London on February 26, 1920. That was a concert of the Royal Philharmonic Society with soloists Maud Willby and Norman Stone, with the newly formed Philharmonic Choir under the direction of its founder Charles Kennedy Scott making its first public appearance. The piece is symphonic, and uses the chorus mainly as a wordless background. Delius explained that

I have tried to express the joy and rapture felt in the High Mountains and to depict the lonely melancholy of the highest altitudes of the wide expanses. The vocal parts typify Man in Nature.

Sir Thomas Beecham described this as one of Delius's major works ('on an heroic scale, and the inspiration is on an exalted level throughout') and a transitional work, in which Delius moved away from the human sensibilities described in such works as Sea Drift towards a 'certain austerity of manner', attaining 'a magical sequence of sounds and echoes, both vocal and instrumental, all culminating in a great outburst of tone that seems to flood the entire landscape.' '...we have hitherto unfamiliar elements of austerity and impersonality, as if the composer had grown tired of interpreting the joys and sorrows of human beings and had turned to the contemplation of nature only.'

Beecham recorded the work on 22 November 1946 with Freda Hart (soprano) and Leslie Jones (tenor), the Luton Choral Society and Royal Philharmonic Orchestra in a form which reached publication on 78 and 33 rpm records.

== Sources ==
- T. Beecham, Frederick Delius (New Edition, with discography), (Severn House 1975).
- R. Elkin, Queen's Hall, 1893-1941 (Rider & Co., London 1944).
- R. Elkin, Royal Philharmonic - The Annals of the Royal Philharmonic Society (Rider & Co., London 1946).
- David Ewen, Encyclopedia of Concert Music. New York; Hill and Wang, 1959.
