= Lionel Carley =

English archivist and scholar (1936–2021)

Lionel Carley (14 May 1936 – 28 December 2021) was an English archivist and author on musical matters. He had particular interest in the life and work of Frederick Delius and Edvard Grieg.

== Life and career ==
After completing his studies, Carley worked for the British Foreign Office and became involved in the music of Frederick Delius at an early stage. Since 1966, he held the post of archivist of the Delius Trust, and since 1991 he was also Advisor to the Trust.

After leaving the diplomatic service, Carley intensified his writing and publishing activities. Carley died on 28 December 2021, at the age of 85.

== Publications ==
- Delius: a life in pictures. Lionel Carley and Robert Threlfall. Publisher: Oxford: Oxford University Press, 1977. ISBN 0-19-315437-4
- Delius, a life in letters. Publisher: Cambridge, Mass.: Harvard University Press, 1983- ISBN 0-674-19570-1
- Delius, a life in letters. Publisher: London: Scolar Press, in association with the Delius Trust, 1983–1988. ISBN 0-85967-717-6 Edition: (v.2)
- Delius, a life in letters. Publisher: London: Scolar Press, in association with the Delius Trust, 1983–1988. ISBN 0-85967-656-0 Edition: (v.1)
- Delius, the Paris years. Publisher: [Rickmansworth]: Triad Press, 1975. ISBN 0-902070-14-2
- Grieg and Delius: a chronicle of their friendship in letters. Publisher: London; M. Boyars, 1993. ISBN 0-7145-2961-3
- Frederick Delius: Music, Art, and Literature. Publisher: Aldershot; Ashgate, 1998. ISBN 1-85928-222-9
