= Ralph Allwood =

British conductor

Ralph Allwood MBE
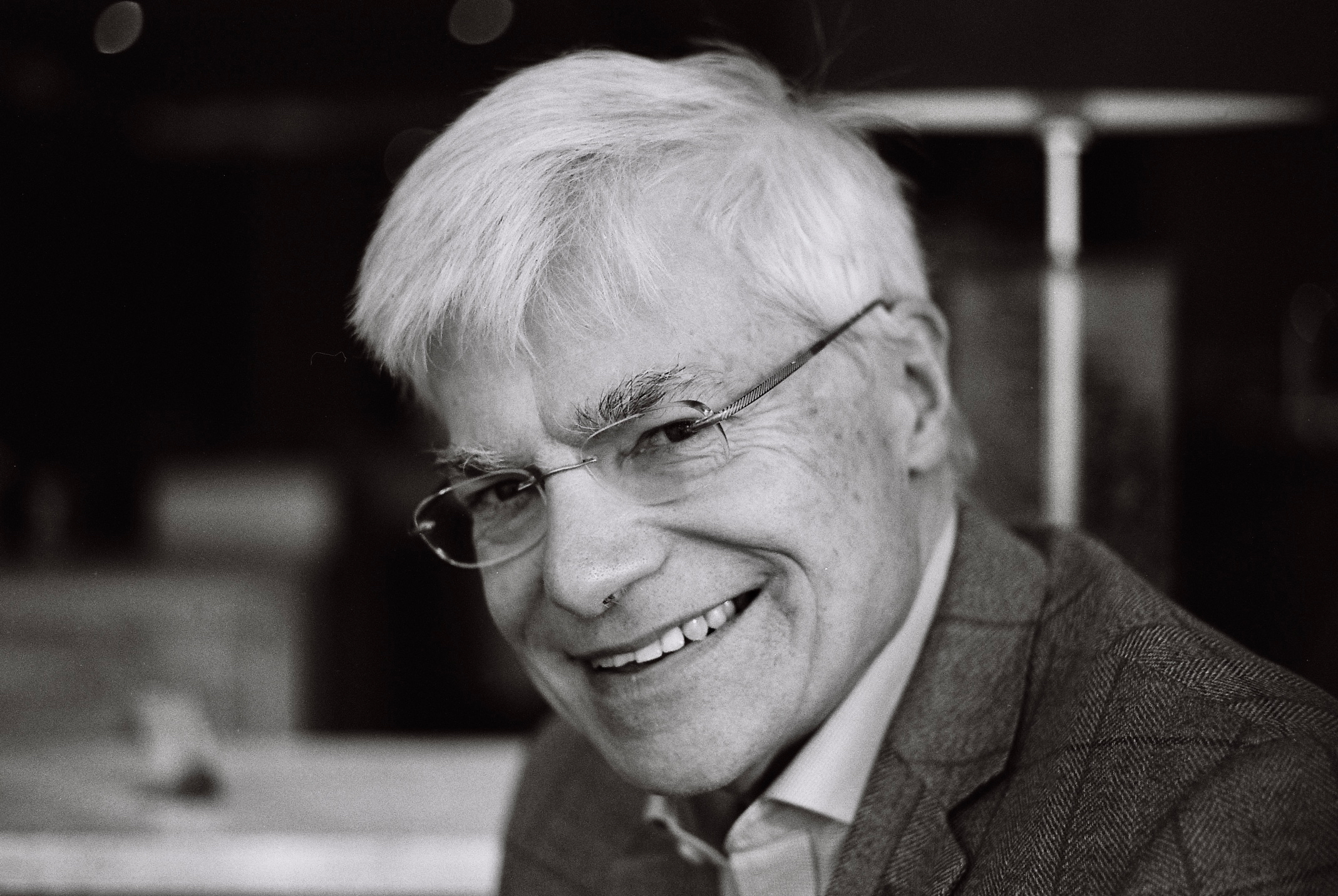
- Ralph Allwood 2018

Background information
- Born: 30 April 1950 (age 75)
- Occupation: Choral conductor
- Spouse: Alastair Davey (married 2024 - present)

Ralph Allwood MBE (born 30 April 1950) is a British choral conductor, composer and teacher, who currently holds the appointment of Fellow Commoner advising in Music at Queens' College, Cambridge. He was previously the Precentor and Director of Music at Eton College between 1985 and 2011. He had previously headed the music departments at Pangbourne and Uppingham.

During his time at Uppingham, he established choral courses, now known as Rodolfus Choral Courses, but formerly known as Uppingham Choral Courses and most recently Eton Choral Courses, of which there are now seven a year. He also conducts the Rodolfus Choir, a critically acclaimed group of singers aged 16–25, drawn principally from these Choral Courses.

Allwood is also the conductor of Inner Voices, a youth chamber choir based in London. Set up in 2011, the choir brings together great singers from a group of London state schools to sing music from across the genre boundaries under the direction of Allwood.

== Career ==
Allwood was educated at Tiffin Boys' School before studying music at Van Mildert College, Durham. He graduated in 1972. Whilst at university, he conducted Durham University Chamber Choir between 1970 and 1972.

Allwood implemented many changes to the Eton College Music Department after his arrival in 1985, including changes to the music lesson and scheduling system and doubling the size of the music schools. One important job was to select the Music Scholars and Exhibitioners for entry into the school in F Block. Allwood directed and ran the College Chapel Choir at Eton, and had been doing so since 1985. In 2009, he announced that he would be retiring from his post as Precentor and Director of Music in 2011. He was replaced as Precentor at Eton by Tim Johnson, who was previously the director of music at Westminster School, in September 2011. In 2012, Allwood was appointed to be Advisor of Chapel Music to the Chapel Choir of Trinity College, Oxford.

In 2021 and 2022 he was director of music for several projects of the Self Isolation Choir (later Choir of the Earth), a virtual choir established during the COVID-19 pandemic. He conducted a series of ABBA songs in his own arrangements, led a project entitled "All Things Bright and Virtual" comprising eight hymns, rehearsed and recorded to the accompaniment of the organs of eight cathedrals or major churches, and conducted his own new arrangement of "God Save the Queen" to celebrate the Platinum Jubilee of Elizabeth II.

== Honours ==
He was appointed a Member of the Order of the British Empire (MBE) in the 2012 New Year Honours "for services to Choral Music".

Allwood was awarded an honorary doctoral degree (DMus) from the University of Aberdeen in 2013.

In 2017, he was awarded the Thomas Cranmer Award for Worship by the Archbishop of Canterbury "for services to choral music in the Church of England and especially for fostering musical education amongst disadvantaged children".

He is an honorary fellow of University College, Durham.

== See also ==
- Eton College
- Rodolfus Choir
