= A Song of Summer =

Tone poem

A Song of Summer is a tone poem for orchestra by Frederick Delius, completed in 1931.

A Song of Summer is derived from an unpublished 1918 symphonic work, originally called Poem of Life and Love. In 1921, Delius told Peter Warlock that he had misplaced most of that score. Delius resumed work on this composition after becoming blind, dictating the notes to his amanuensis, Eric Fenby.

Sir Henry J. Wood conducted the premiere in London on 17 September 1931. The first recording was made by John Barbirolli with the Hallé Orchestra on 4 February 1950. Fenby himself also recorded the score with the Royal Philharmonic Orchestra in a recording released in 1981.

Delius explained the context of the tone poem to Fenby by saying:

"I want you to imagine we are sitting on the cliffs of heather and looking out over the sea. The sustained chords in the high strings suggest the clear sky and stillness and calm of the scene...You must remember that figure that comes in the violins when the music becomes more animated. I'm introducing it there to suggest the gentle rise and fall of the waves. The flutes suggest a seagull gliding by."

The tone poem lent its title to the TV film Song of Summer, directed by Ken Russell and first broadcast in 1968. It depicts Eric Fenby's life as Delius's amanuensis and part of this piece is heard in the film, along with other works by Delius.

== Sources ==
- David Ewen, Encyclopedia of Concert Music. New York; Hill and Wang, 1959.
