= A Mass of Life =

Choral work, 1905, by Frederick Delius

Frederick Delius, photographed in 1907

A Mass of Life (German: Eine Messe des Lebens) is a cantata by English composer Frederick Delius, based on the German text of Friedrich Nietzsche's philosophical novel Thus Spoke Zarathustra (1883-1885). In 1898, Delius had written a male choir and orchestral setting of "Midnight Song" from the same work, and this was revised to form part of the Mass.

Eine Messe des Lebens is the largest of Delius's concert works, being written for four SATB soloists, double choir and orchestra. It was dedicated to Fritz Cassirer, who had had an important hand in choosing the passages from Nietzsche's text. Lionel Carley and others, writing in Grove Music Online, describe it as the composer's "grandest project" and say that "Delius responded to Nietzsche's rich poetry in some of his most virile and exultant music, as well as in passages of a profoundly hypnotic and static calm."

The work was completed in 1905. Part 2 was first performed in Munich in 1908, with a complete performance in London a year later.

In September 2022 the Bergen Philharmonic Orchestra and Choir performed the Norwegian premiere of the work, conducted by Mark Elder and with Roderick Williams singing the lead role of Zarathustra. A recording featuring the same performers was issued in 2023.

In a collaborative project supported by the Delius Trust, Choir of the Earth, led by musical director and conductor Ben England, worked closely with Bergen Philharmonic Choir to create a first-of-its-kind performance, blending a live performance with individual voices recorded in choristers' homes around the world. Both Choirs simultaneously rehearsed the choral parts of A Mass of Life, both separately and in livestreamed rehearsals led by Ben England and Bergen's choral director Håkon Matti Skrede. At the Bergen premiere in September 2022, Choir of the Earth's sound engineers captured high-fidelity recordings and used these to produce guide tracks, allowing choristers around the world to record their voices at home in perfect synchronicity with the Bergen Philharmonic Choir. The combined performance featuring Choir of the Earth's recordings alongside the live performance recorded in Bergen premiered on YouTube in October 2023.

== Orchestral Instrumentation ==
2 flutes; piccolo 3 oboes; cor inglese; bass oboe 3 clarinets; bass clarinet 3 fagotti; contrafagotto 6 horns; 4 trumpets; 3 trombones; tuba timpani; grosse caisse; side drum; cymbals; castanets; triangle, glockenspiel, tam-tam (deep), bells 2 harps strings
