= Sea Drift (Carpenter) =

Sea Drift is a tone poem for orchestra composed by John Alden Carpenter in 1933; it was premiered by the Chicago Symphony under Frederick Stock on November 30, 1933.[1]

It is an example of Impressionist music, inspired by the Walt Whitman's Sea-Drift poems and divided into two sections. Much of the material in the first part is assigned to the horn; in the second, the main theme is stated by the English horn before being repeated by strings.

== See also ==
Sea-Drift, for other works inspired by these poems.
