= Patrolling Barnegat =

Poem

"Patrolling Barnegat" is a poem by Walt Whitman, first published in Leaves of Grass. It is the penultimate poem in Book XIX titled Sea-Drift. The poem follows "Song for All Seas, All Ships" and is followed by the last poem of the section "After the Sea-Ship". It was written in 1880 when Whitman retired to Camden, New Jersey. The poem deals with a stormy night at the coast of Barnegat.

== Text ==
Wild, wild the storm, and the sea high running,

Steady the roar of the gale, with incessant undertone muttering,

Shouts of demoniac laughter fitfully piercing and pealing,

Waves, air, midnight, their savagest trinity lashing,

Out in the shadows there milk-white combs careering,

On beachy slush and sand spirts of snow fierce slanting,

Where through the murk the easterly death-wind breasting,

Through cutting swirl and spray watchful and firm advancing,

(That in the distance! is that a wreck? is the red signal flaring?)

Slush and sand of the beach tireless till daylight wending,

Steadily, slowly, through hoarse roar never remitting,

Along the midnight edge by those milk-white combs careering,

A group of dim, weird forms, struggling, the night confronting,

That savage trinity warily watching.
