= Song of Summer =

1965 music biopic by Ken Russell

- Omnibus episode
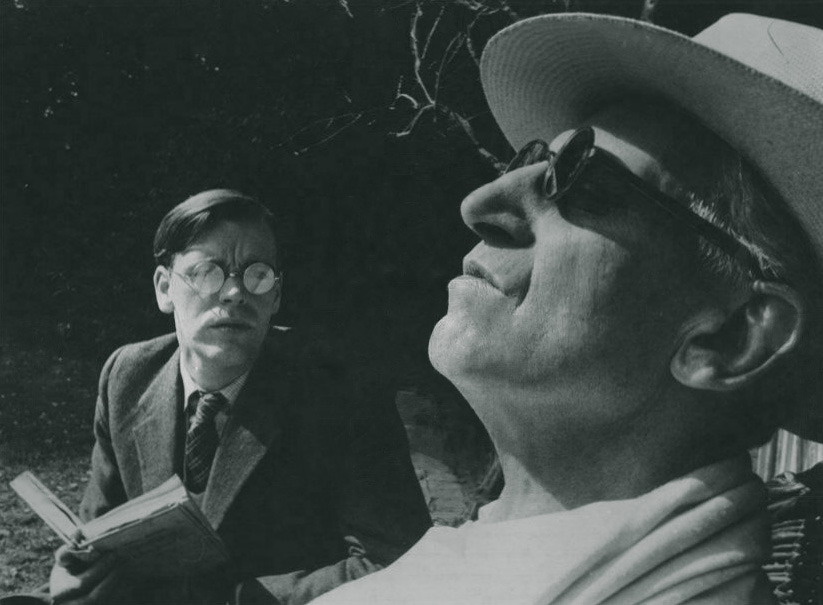
- Christopher Gable, left, as Eric Fenby and Max Adrian as Frederick Delius
- Episode no.: Series 2 Episode 1
- Directed by: Ken Russell
- Written by: Ken Russell, Eric Fenby
- Based on: Delius As I Knew Him by Eric Fenby
- Cinematography by: Dick Bush
- Editing by: Roger Crittenden
- Original air date: 1968
- Running time: 72 minutes (DVD)

"Song of Summer" is a 1968 black-and-white television episode co-written, produced, and directed by Ken Russell for the BBC's Omnibus series which was first broadcast on 15 September 1968. It portrays the final six years of Frederick Delius's life, during which Eric Fenby lived with the composer and his wife Jelka as Delius's amanuensis. The title is borrowed from Delius's tone poem A Song of Summer, which is heard along with other works by Delius on the film's soundtrack.

It stars Max Adrian as Delius, Christopher Gable as Fenby, and Maureen Pryor as Jelka, with director Russell in a cameo role as a philandering priest. The cinematography was by Dick Bush, and the editing was by Roger Crittenden. It was shot on black-and-white 35mm film.

It has received wide praise since its first screening, and Ken Russell said that it was the best film he ever made, and that he would not have done a single shot differently.

== Film and book synopsis ==
Song of Summer is based on Eric Fenby's memoir Delius As I Knew Him (1936, republished and revised in 1966), which recounts his offer to transcribe Frederick Delius's music from the composer's dictation. It follows the book closely, as Fenby was also co-writer of the screenplay.

In the late 1920s, Fenby is a struggling 22-year-old composer and theatre organist living with his parents in Scarborough, North Yorkshire. He loves the music of Yorkshire-born composer Frederick Delius and reads that the composer has unfinished new works, but can't complete them due to his severe illnesses. Fenby writes to the 66-year-old Delius, who lives with his wife Jelka and their servants in Grez-sur-Loing, roughly 70 kilometres south of Paris. Delius has never heard of Fenby. Nonetheless, the Delius couple accepts Fenby's unsolicited offer.

Fenby stays with the Deliuses on and off for six years and shares their quiet, eccentric life, centered around the person and illness of Delius. He has difficulty dealing with the cantankerous, irascible and impatient composer, although Delius's conduct may be the product of his constant pain. Neither party has ever worked this way before, but Fenby is expected to keep up with Delius's fast pace when dictating and to make sense of his out-of-tune singing. He is also required to read to Delius for long stretches, with the composer's favourite books being Mark Twain's Adventures of Huckleberry Finn and Tom Sawyer. Fenby is a devout Catholic, while Delius hates Christianity, even going so far as to tell Fenby not to attend the local chapel but to visit one further away.

On a first visit home, Fenby has a nervous breakdown and loses the use of his legs for two weeks. Later, Jelka needs to undergo treatment for stomach cancer, and Fenby effectively becomes Delius's nurse for a month. Delius dies only two days after Jelka returns, in 1934.

== Cast ==
- Max Adrian as Frederick Delius
- Christopher Gable as Eric Fenby
- Maureen Pryor as Jelka Delius
- David Collings as Percy Grainger
- Roger Worrod as Bruder, the German servant, who reads Nietzsche and Edgar Wallace to Delius, feeds him, and carries him from room to room
- Geraldine Sherman the girl next door
- Elizabeth Ercy as Delius' maid
- Norman James as the doctor
- Ken Russell as the philandering priest (uncredited)

== Production background ==
Eric Fenby coached actors Max Adrian (Delius) and Christopher Gable (Fenby) in their roles, and regarded their portrayals as "absolutely true to character" and the film as "disturbingly lifelike". However, he did not attend the actual filming, to avoid distracting the director, and at the request of Gable, who was making his first film (he had previously been a dancer with the Royal Ballet). Max Adrian was a favourite actor of Ken Russell. Adrian told Fenby that he had more difficulty in ridding himself of involvement in the role of Delius than he had ever experienced with other roles.

== Reception ==
The film has often been described as the best of the biographical films Ken Russell made for the BBC in the 1960s. (He had previously made films about Bartók, Elgar and Debussy, and would later make films about Richard Strauss, Tchaikovsky, Liszt and others.) Words like "subtle", "sensitive", "exquisite", "moving", "beautiful", "poignant", "magical", "exceptional" and "tour de force" recur in critiques of Song of Summer. The acting by the principals was universally praised. When he saw the finished film, Eric Fenby was traumatised, for it brought to the surface feelings he had been suppressing for decades, and he suffered a severe nervous breakdown which took him a full year to recover from.

In 2001, a slightly shortened version was released on DVD, as Delius: Song of Summer.

Kate Bush's song "Delius (Song of Summer)", the B-side of her 1980 "Army Dreamers", is an appreciation of the composer as portrayed in Russell's film.

== Music ==
Song of Summer uses the music of Delius throughout, except for a scene in which Percy Grainger calls at Grez, and Country Gardens and Handel in the Strand are heard, and another in which Delius has a record of Jerome Kern's "Ol' Man River" played. The original film starts with an excerpt from a Laurel and Hardy film, and shows Fenby improvising music on an organ for the cinema patrons. In the DVD release, copyright permission for the Laurel and Hardy film could not be obtained, so the introduction was cut from the release, although the music credits still include Eric Fenby.

== Details ==
A theme that is quite overtly explored is the dichotomy between a composer who is an egotistical and tyrannical monster and womaniser (his blindness and paralysis were the result of tertiary syphilis contracted at Paris brothels and with other women), but who writes ravishingly beautiful, lyrical, sensitive music. Fenby comments: "I can't reconcile such hardness with such lovely music."

Russell explored the possibility of making the film at the Deliuses' home in Grez, but that proved impractical. Budgetary considerations meant that it could not be made in France at all, so it was filmed mainly in Surrey, with extra scenes in Scarborough and the Lake District.

The gramophone used in the film was Delius's own, and Jelka's scattering of rose petals over Frederick's dead body from her wheelchair was exactly what she did in real life.

One scene shows Fenby attending a church and discovering the parish priest (played by Ken Russell) having sex with a girl in a pew. This episode apparently occurred, but it is not mentioned in Delius As I Knew Him. Fenby told it to Russell for his ears alone and was shocked when he saw it in the film.

== Inaccuracies ==
- The Laurel and Hardy film shown was Way Out West (1937), which was a sound film, was made after the events of 'Song of Summer", and would not have required additional music from a theatre organ.
- Although he had various paintings by Edvard Munch, Delius did not own any version of The Scream, which is shown on the wall of Fenby's room.
- Jelka puts on a recording of The Walk to the Paradise Garden from his opera A Village Romeo and Juliet, accidentally starting on side 2. When Delius rudely corrects her, she apologises and puts on side 1, but what we hear is music that actually starts six bars later than the music she put on first.
- Eric Fenby is shown playing chess with his father, who is wearing an open-necked shirt. In fact Fenby's father could not play chess, and Eric never saw him without a collar and tie.
- The chessboard is oriented incorrectly. In chess the top left square, or a8, is always white, whereas it is shown as black.
