= Frederick Delius =

English composer (1862–1934)

Delius, photographed in 1907

Frederick Theodore Albert Delius (born Fritz Theodor Albert Delius; /ˈdiːliəs/; 29 January 1862 – 10 June 1934) was an English composer. Born in Bradford in the north of England to a prosperous mercantile family, he resisted attempts to recruit him to commerce. He went to Florida in the United States in 1884 to manage his father's orange plantation. He soon neglected his managerial duties, and in 1886 returned to Europe.

Having been influenced by African-American music during his short stay in Florida, he began composing. After a brief period of formal musical study in Germany beginning in 1886, he embarked on a full-time career as a composer in Paris, and then in nearby Grez-sur-Loing, where he and his wife Jelka lived for the rest of their lives, except during the First World War.

Delius's first successes came in Germany, where Hans Haym and other conductors promoted his music from the late 1890s. In Delius's native Britain, his music did not make regular appearances in concert programmes until 1907, when Thomas Beecham took it up. Beecham conducted the full premiere of A Mass of Life in London in 1909 (he had premiered Part II in Germany in 1908). He staged the opera A Village Romeo and Juliet at Covent Garden in 1910, and mounted a six-day Delius festival in London in 1929, as well as making gramophone recordings of many of the composer's works. After 1918, Delius began to suffer the effects of syphilis, contracted during his earlier years in Paris. He became paralysed and blind but completed some compositions between 1928 and 1932 with the aid of an amanuensis, Eric Fenby.

The lyricism in Delius's early compositions reflected the music he had heard in America and the influences of European composers such as Grieg and Wagner. As his skills matured, he developed a style uniquely his own, characterised by his individual orchestration and his uses of chromatic harmony. Delius's music has been only intermittently popular, and often subject to critical attacks. The Delius Society, formed in 1962 by his more dedicated followers, continues to promote knowledge of the composer's life and works, and sponsors the annual Delius Prize competition for young musicians.

== Life ==
=== Early years ===
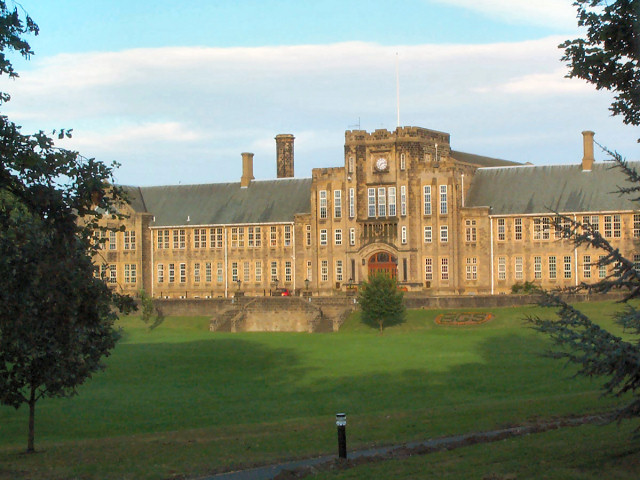
Delius's school (he attended the previous building) Bradford Grammar School

Delius was born in Bradford in Yorkshire. He was baptised as Fritz Theodor Albert Delius, and used the forename Fritz until he was about 40. He was the second of four sons – there were also ten daughters – born to Julius Delius (1822–1901) and his wife Elise Pauline, née Krönig (1838–1929). Delius's parents were born in Bielefeld, Westphalia, (Note: Now part of the Ostwestfalen-Lippe region of Germany.) and Julius's family, originally Dutch, had already lived for several generations in German lands near the Rhine. (Note: According to Sir Thomas Beecham, the Dutch Delius family had changed its patronymic from Delij or Deligh to a latinised form of the name some time in the sixteenth century, a common practice at the time.) Julius's father, Ernst Friedrich Delius, had served under Blücher in the Napoleonic Wars. Julius moved to England to further his career as a wool merchant, and became a naturalised British subject in 1850. He married Elise in 1856.

The Delius household was musical. Famous musicians such as Joseph Joachim and Carlo Alfredo Piatti were guests, and played for the family. Despite his German parentage, the young Fritz was drawn to the music of Chopin and Grieg rather than the Austro-German music of Mozart and Beethoven, a preference that endured all his life. The young Delius was first taught the violin by Rudolph Bauerkeller of the Hallé Orchestra, and had more advanced studies under George Haddock of Leeds.

Although Delius achieved enough skill as a violinist to set up as a violin teacher in later years, his chief musical joy was to improvise at the piano, and it was a piano piece, a waltz by Chopin, that gave him his first ecstatic encounter with music. (Note: The Chopin piece was the posthumously published Waltz in E minor.) From 1874 to 1878, he was educated at Bradford Grammar School, where the singer John Coates was his slightly older contemporary; Delius then attended the International College at Isleworth (just west of London) between 1878 and 1880. As a pupil he was neither especially quick nor diligent, but the college was conveniently close to the city for Delius to be able to attend concerts and opera.

Julius Delius assumed that his son would play a part in the family wool business, and for the next three years he tried hard to persuade him to do so. Delius's first job was as the firm's representative in Stroud in Gloucestershire, where he did moderately well. However, after being sent in a similar capacity to Chemnitz, he neglected his duties in favour of trips to the major musical centres of Germany, and musical studies with Hans Sitt. His father sent him to Sweden, where he again put his artistic interests ahead of commerce, coming under the influence of the Norwegian dramatists Henrik Ibsen and Gunnar Heiberg. Ibsen's denunciations of social conventions further alienated Delius from his commercial background. He was then sent to represent the firm in France, but frequently absented himself from business for excursions to the French Riviera. After that, Julius Delius recognised that there was no prospect that his son would succeed in the family business, but he remained opposed to music as a profession, and Fritz went to America to manage an orange plantation his father had bought.

=== Florida ===
It is not clear whether the move to America was Julius's idea or his son's. (Note: The composer Peter Warlock (real name Philip Heseltine) wrote in 1915 that the idea was Frederick's, rather than Julius's, but cites no authority for that statement.) A leading Florida property firm had branches in several English cities, including Bradford, and, in an article on Delius's time in Florida, William Randel conjectured that either Julius Delius visited the Bradford office and conceived the notion of sending his wayward son to grow oranges in Florida, or that Fritz himself suggested the idea to his father, as a way to escape the hated family wool business. Delius was in Florida from the spring of 1884 to the autumn of 1885, living on a plantation at Solano Grove (Note: 29°52′29″N 81°34′34″W between Picolata and Tocoi) on the Saint Johns River, about 25 miles (40 kilometres) south of Jacksonville. He continued to be engrossed in music, and in Jacksonville he met Thomas Ward, who became his teacher in counterpoint and composition. Delius later said that Ward's teaching was the only useful music instruction he ever had.

Map of Florida's St. Johns River in 1876; Delius' house at Solano Grove lay between Picolata and Tocoi on the east bank

Delius later liked to represent his house at Solano Grove as "a shanty", but it was a substantial cottage of four rooms, with plenty of space for Delius to entertain guests. (Note: The building fell into decay after he left it, but it was rescued by Jacksonville University, moved to the university campus in 1961, and restored.) Ward sometimes stayed there, as did an old Bradford friend, Charles Douglas, and Delius's brother Ernest. Protected from excessive summer heat by river breezes and a canopy of oak trees, the house was an agreeable place to live in.

Delius paid little attention to the business of growing oranges, and continued to pursue his musical interests. Jacksonville had a rich, though to a European, unorthodox musical life. Randel notes that the African-American waiters in local hotels doubled as singers, with daily vocal concerts for patrons and passers-by, giving Delius his introduction to spirituals in local hotels. Additionally, ship owners encouraged their deckhands to sing as they worked. "Delius never forgot the singing as he heard it, day or night, carried sweet and clear across the water to his verandah at Solano Grove, whenever a steam-ship passed; it is hard to imagine conditions less conducive to cultivating oranges – or more conducive to composing."

While in Florida, Delius had his first composition published, a polka for piano called Zum Carnival. In late 1885 he left a caretaker in charge of Solano Grove and moved to Danville, Virginia. Thereafter he pursued a wholly musical career. An advertisement in the local paper announced, "Fritz Delius will begin at once giving instruction in Piano, Violin, Theory and Composition. He will give lessons at the residences of his pupils. Terms reasonable." Delius also offered lessons in French and German. Danville had a thriving musical life, and early works of his were publicly performed there.

=== Illegitimate son ===
During his time in Florida, Delius is alleged to have fathered a son with a local African-American woman named Chloe. Upon Delius's return to Florida some years later to sell the plantation, it was suggested that Chloe, fearing that he had come to take her son away from her, fled with the child and disappeared. In the 1990s the violinist Tasmin Little embarked on a search for descendants of Delius's alleged love-child. Little believes that his failure to track down his son had been a significant influence in the tone of his works thereafter.

=== Leipzig and Paris ===
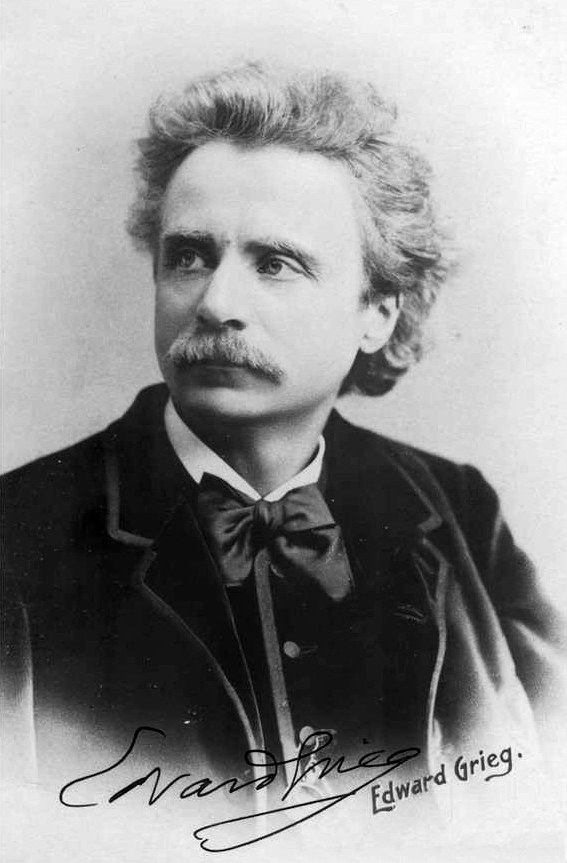
Edvard Grieg, who was a strong influence on Delius's earlier music

In 1886, Julius Delius finally agreed to allow his son to pursue a musical career, and paid for him to study music formally. Delius left Danville and returned to Europe via New York, where he paused briefly to give a few lessons. Back in Europe he enrolled at the conservatoire in Leipzig, Germany. Leipzig was a major musical centre, where Arthur Nikisch and Gustav Mahler were conductors at the Opera House, and Brahms and Tchaikovsky conducted their works at the Gewandhaus. At the conservatoire, Delius made little progress in his piano studies under Carl Reinecke, but Salomon Jadassohn praised his hard work and grasp of counterpoint; Delius also resumed studies under Hans Sitt. Delius's early biographer, the composer Patrick Hadley, observed that no trace of his academic tuition can be found in Delius's mature music "except in certain of the weaker passages". Much more important to Delius's development was meeting the composer Edvard Grieg in Leipzig. Grieg, like Ward before him, recognised Delius's potential. In the spring of 1888, Sitt conducted Delius's Florida Suite for an audience of three: Grieg, Christian Sinding and the composer. (Note: According to Hadley, the orchestral players were paid in beer.) Grieg and Sinding were enthusiastic and became warm supporters of Delius. At a dinner party in London in April 1888, Grieg finally convinced Julius Delius that his son's future lay in music.

After leaving Leipzig in 1888, Delius moved to Paris where his uncle, Theodore, took him under his wing and looked after him socially and financially. Over the next eight years, Delius befriended many writers and artists, including August Strindberg, Edvard Munch and Paul Gauguin. He mixed very little with French musicians, although Florent Schmitt arranged the piano scores of Delius's first two operas, Irmelin and The Magic Fountain (Ravel later did the same for his verismo opera Margot la rouge). As a result, his music never became widely known in France. (Note: Hadley, writing in 1946, commented that Delius's music remained unknown in France. The critic Eric Blom wrote in 1929, while the composer was still alive: "Domiciled in France for nearly three decades, in Paris his name is a blank among the ordinary concert-goers and a curiosity among musicians. In cultivating music lovingly in his quiet riverside home at Grez, he fatally omitted to cultivate the musicians of the capital: the result is an artistic ostracism as rigid as only the injured vanity of Parisian art-circles can decree it." In 2007, the critic Michael White wrote, "European snobbery still prevailed, especially in France, where as late as the 1970s Nadia Boulanger claimed never to have heard of Delius.") Delius's biographer Diana McVeagh says of these years that Delius "was found to be attractive, warm-hearted, spontaneous, and amorous". It is generally believed that during this period he contracted the syphilis that caused the collapse of his health in later years.

Delius's Paris years were musically productive. His symphonic poem Paa Vidderne was performed in Christiania in 1891 and in Monte Carlo in 1894; Gunnar Heiberg commissioned Delius to provide incidental music for his play Folkeraadet in 1897; and Delius's second opera, The Magic Fountain, was accepted for staging at Prague, but the project fell through for unknown reasons. Other works of the period were the fantasy overture Over the Hills and Far Away (1895–1897) and orchestral variations, Appalachia: Variations on an Old Slave Song (1896, rewritten in 1904 for voices and orchestra).

=== First successes ===
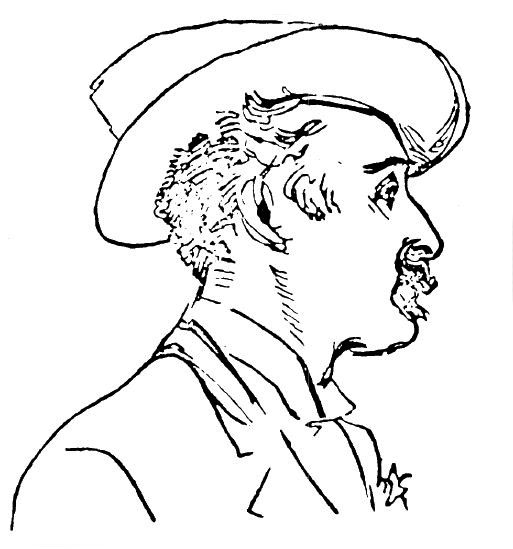
Delius in 1897 by Christian Krohg

In 1897, Delius met the German artist Jelka Rosen, who later became his wife. She was a professional painter, a friend of Auguste Rodin, and a regular exhibitor at the Salon des Indépendants. Jelka quickly declared her admiration for the young composer's music, and the couple were drawn closer together by a shared passion for the works of the German philosopher Friedrich Nietzsche and the music of Grieg. Jelka bought a house in Grez-sur-Loing, a village 40 miles (64 km) outside Paris on the edge of Fontainebleau. Delius visited her there, and after a brief return visit to Florida, he moved in with her.

They married in 1903 and, apart from a short period when the area was threatened by the advancing German army during the First World War, Delius lived in Grez for the rest of his life. The marriage was not conventional: Jelka was, at first, the principal earner. There were no children; and Delius was not a faithful husband. Jelka was often distressed by his affairs, but her devotion did not waver.

In the same year, Delius began a fruitful association with German supporters of his music, the conductors Hans Haym, Fritz Cassirer and Alfred Hertz at Elberfeld, and Julius Buths at Düsseldorf. Haym conducted Over the Hills and Far Away, which he gave under its German title Über die Berge in die Ferne (Note: Literally "Over the mountains in the distance") on 13 November 1897, believed to be the first time Delius's music was heard in Germany. In 1899 Hertz gave a Delius concert in St. James's Hall in London, which included Over the Hills and Far Away, a choral piece, Mitternachtslied, and excerpts from the opera Koanga. This occasion was an unusual opportunity for an unknown composer at a time when any sort of orchestral concert was a rare event in London. In spite of encouraging reviews, Delius's orchestral music was not heard again in an English concert hall until 1907.

The orchestral work Paris: The Song of a Great City was composed in 1899 and dedicated to Haym. He gave the premiere at Elberfeld on 14 December 1901. It provoked some critical comment from the local newspaper, which complained that the composer put his listeners on a bus and shuttled them from one Parisian night-spot to another, "but he does not let us hear the tuneful gypsy melodies in the boulevard cafés, always just cymbals and tambourine and mostly from two cabarets at the same time at that". The work was given under Busoni in Berlin less than a year later.

Most of Delius's premieres of this period were given by Haym and his fellow German conductors. In 1904 Cassirer premiered Koanga, and in the same year the Piano Concerto was given in Elberfeld, and Lebenstanz in Düsseldorf. Appalachia (choral orchestral variations on an old slave song, also inspired by Florida) followed there in 1905. Sea Drift (a cantata with words taken from a poem by Walt Whitman) was premiered at Essen in 1906, and the opera A Village Romeo and Juliet in Berlin in 1907. Delius's reputation in Germany remained high until the First World War; in 1910 his rhapsody Brigg Fair was performed by 36 different German orchestras.

=== Growing reputation ===
Thomas Beecham in 1910

By 1907, thanks to performances of his works in many German cities, Delius was, as Thomas Beecham said, "floating safely on a wave of prosperity which increased as the year went on". Henry Wood premiered the revised version of Delius's Piano Concerto that year. Also in 1907, Cassirer conducted some concerts in London, at one of which, with Beecham's New Symphony Orchestra, he presented Appalachia. Beecham, who had until then heard not a note of Delius's music, expressed his "wonderment" and became a lifelong devotee of the composer's works. In January 1908, he conducted the British premiere of Paris: The Song of a Great City. Later that year, Beecham introduced Brigg Fair to London audiences, and Enrique Fernández Arbós presented Lebenstanz.

In 1909, Beecham conducted the first complete performance of A Mass of Life, the largest and most ambitious of Delius's concert works, written for four soloists, a double choir, and a large orchestra. Although the work was based on the same Nietzsche work as Richard Strauss's Also sprach Zarathustra, Delius distanced himself from the Strauss work, which he considered a complete failure. Nor was Strauss an admirer of Delius, as he was of Elgar; he told Delius that he did not wish to conduct Paris – "the symphonic development seems to me to be too scant, and it seems moreover to be an imitation of Charpentier".

In the early years of the 20th century, Delius composed some of his most popular works, including Brigg Fair (1907), In a Summer Garden (1908, revised 1911), Summer Night on the River (1911), and On Hearing the First Cuckoo in Spring (1912), of which McVeagh comments, "These exquisite idylls, for all their composer's German descent and French domicile, spell 'England' for most listeners." In 1910, Beecham put on an opera season at the Royal Opera House in London. Having access to the Beecham family's considerable fortune, he ignored commercial considerations and programmed several works of limited box-office appeal, including A Village Romeo and Juliet. (Note: Other operas in this season included Richard Strauss's Elektra, which made a profit, and Ethel Smyth's The Wreckers and Arthur Sullivan's Ivanhoe, which did not.) The reviews were polite, but The Times, having praised the orchestral aspects of the score, commented, "Mr. Delius seems to have remarkably little sense of dramatic writing for the voice". Other reviewers agreed that the score contained passages of great beauty, but was ineffective as drama.

=== War and post-war ===
During the First World War, Delius and Jelka moved from Grez to avoid the hostilities. They took up temporary residence in the south of England, where Delius continued to compose. In 1915, The Musical Times published a profile of him by his admirer, the composer Philip Heseltine (known as "Peter Warlock"), who commented:

[H]e holds no official position in the musical life of the country [i.e. Britain]; he does not teach in any of the academies, he is not even an honorary professor or doctor of music. He never gives concerts or makes propaganda for his music; he never conducts an orchestra, or plays an instrument in public (even Berlioz played the tambourine!)

Heseltine depicted Delius as a composer uncompromisingly focused on his own music. "There can be no superficial view of Delius's music: either one feels it in the very depths of one's being, or not at all. This may be a part of the reason why one so seldom hears a really first-rate performance of Delius's work, save under Mr. Beecham". (Note: Heseltine first met Delius in 1911 when, as a schoolboy, he attended a Beecham concert of Delius's works. From this meeting a friendship and correspondence developed that lasted for the remainder of Heseltine's life (he died in 1930). Delius was a profound influence on Heseltine's own early compositions.)

James Elroy Flecker (1884–1915). Delius provided incidental music to Flecker's Hassan, premiered in 1923.

One of Delius's major wartime works was his Requiem, dedicated "to the memory of all young Artists fallen in the war". The work owes nothing to the traditional Christian liturgy, eschewing notions of an afterlife and celebrating instead a pantheistic renewal of Nature. When Albert Coates presented the work in London in 1922, its atheism offended some believers. This attitude persisted long after Delius's death, as the Requiem did not receive another performance in the UK until 1965, and by 1980 had still had only seven performances world-wide. In Germany, the regular presentation of Delius's works ceased at the outbreak of the war, and never resumed. Nevertheless, his standing with some continental musicians was unaffected; Beecham records that Bartók and Kodály were admirers of Delius, and the former grew into the habit of sending his compositions to Delius for comment and tried to interest him in both Hungarian and Romanian popular music.

By the end of the war, Delius and Jelka had returned to Grez. He had begun to show symptoms of syphilis that he had probably contracted in the 1880s. He took treatment at clinics across Europe, but by 1922 he was walking with two sticks, and by 1928 he was paralysed and blind. There was no return to the prosperity of pre-war years: Delius's medical treatment was an additional expense, his blindness prevented him from composing, and his royalties were curtailed by the lack of continental performances of his music. Beecham gave discreet financial help, and the composer and musical benefactor H. Balfour Gardiner bought the house at Grez and allowed Delius and Jelka to live there rent-free.

Beecham was temporarily absent from the concert hall and opera house between 1920 and 1923, but Coates gave the first performance of A Song of the High Hills in 1920, and Henry Wood and Hamilton Harty programmed Delius's music with the Queen's Hall and Hallé Orchestras. Wood gave the British première of the Double Concerto for violin and cello in 1920, and of A Song Before Sunrise and the Dance Rhapsody No. 2 in 1923. Delius had a financial and artistic success with his incidental music for James Elroy Flecker's play Hassan (1923), with 281 performances at His Majesty's Theatre. With Beecham's return the composer became, in Hadley's words, "what his most fervent admirers had never envisaged – a genuine popular success". Hadley cites, in particular, the six-day Delius festival at the Queen's Hall in 1929 under Beecham's general direction, in the presence of the composer in his bath-chair. "[T]he cream of his orchestral output with and without soli and chorus was included", and the hall was filled. Beecham was assisted in the organisation of the festival by Philip Heseltine, who wrote the detailed programme notes for three of the six concerts. The festival included chamber music and songs, an excerpt from A Village Romeo and Juliet, the Piano and Violin Concertos, and premières of Cynara and A Late Lark, concluding with A Mass of Life. The Manchester Guardian's music critic, Neville Cardus, met Delius during the festival. He describes the wreck of the composer's physique, yet "there was nothing pitiable about him ... his face was strong and disdainful, every line graven on it by intrepid living". Delius, Cardus says, spoke with a noticeable Yorkshire accent as he dismissed most English music as paper music that should never be heard, written by people "afraid of their feelin's".

=== Last years ===
A young English admirer, Eric Fenby, learning that Delius was trying to compose by dictating to Jelka, volunteered his services as an unpaid amanuensis. For five years, from 1928, he worked with Delius, taking down his new compositions from dictation, and helping him revise earlier works. Together they produced Cynara (a setting of words by Ernest Dowson), A Late Lark (a setting of W. E. Henley), A Song of Summer, a third violin sonata, the Irmelin prelude, and Idyll (1932), which reused music from Delius's short opera Margot la rouge, composed thirty years earlier. McVeagh rates their greatest joint production as The Songs of Farewell, settings of Whitman poems for chorus and orchestra, which were dedicated to Jelka. Other works produced in this period include a Caprice and Elegy for cello and orchestra written for the cellist Beatrice Harrison, and a short orchestral piece, Fantastic Dance, which Delius dedicated to Fenby. The violin sonata incorporates the first, incomprehensible, melody that Delius had attempted to dictate to Fenby before their modus operandi had been worked out. Fenby's initial failure to pick up the tune led Delius to the view that "[the] boy is no good ... he cannot even take down a simple melody". (Note: A complete list of the works created or revised during the Delius–Fenby collaboration is provided in Fenby (1981), pp. 261–62.) Fenby later wrote a book about his experiences of working with Delius. Among other details, Fenby reveals Delius's love of cricket. The pair followed the 1930 Test series between England and Australia with great interest, and regaled a bemused Jelka with accounts of their boyhood exploits in the game. In 1932, Delius was awarded the Freedom of the City of Bradford.

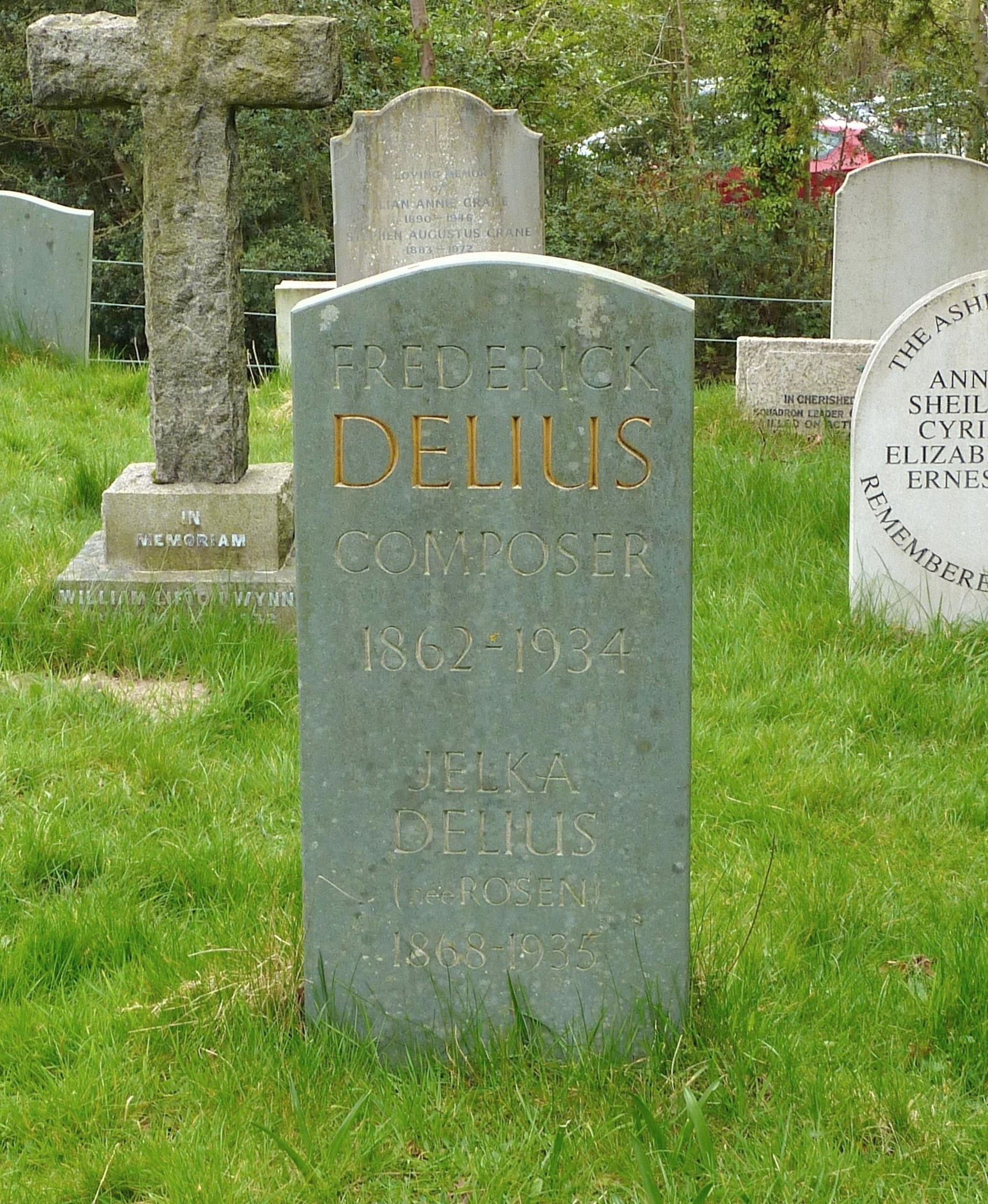
Delius's grave at St Peter's Church in Limpsfield, Surrey, 2013

In 1933, the year before both composers died, Elgar, who had flown to Paris to conduct a performance of his Violin Concerto, visited Delius at Grez. Delius was not, on the whole, an admirer of Elgar's music, (Note: Delius said of Elgar's First Symphony: "It starts with a theme out of the Parcival Prelude a little altered. The slow movement is a theme out of Verdi's Requiem a little altered. The rest is Mendelssohn and Brahms, thick and without the slightest orchestral charm – gray – and they all shout 'Masterwork'!" He also called The Dream of Gerontius nauseating, although he admired Elgar's Falstaff.) Despite Delius's criticisims, the two men took to each other, and there followed a warm correspondence until Elgar's death in February 1934. Elgar described Delius as "a poet and a visionary".

Delius died at Grez on 10 June 1934, aged 72. He had wanted to be buried in his own garden, but the French authorities forbade it. His alternative wish, despite his atheism, was to be buried "in some country churchyard in the south of England, where people could place wild flowers". At that time Jelka was too ill to make the journey across the Channel, and Delius was temporarily buried in the local cemetery at Grez.

By May 1935, Jelka felt she had enough strength to undertake the crossing to attend a reburial in England. She chose St Peter's church, Limpsfield, Surrey as the site for the grave. (Note: According to Beatrice Harrison's sister Margaret, there was some question whether Anglican churches would be willing to accept the body of a professed atheist for burial. The Harrison family, who lived nearby, secured the agreement of the vicar of Limpsfield, and Jelka chose St Peter's churchyard for her husband's reinterment.) She sailed to England for the service, but became ill en route, and on arrival was taken to hospital in Dover and then Kensington in London, missing the reburial on 26 May. The ceremony took place at midnight; the headline in the Sunday Dispatch was "Sixty People Under Flickering Lamps In A Surrey Churchyard". The vicar offered a prayer: "May the souls of the departed through the mercy of God rest in peace." Jelka died two days later, on 28 May. She was buried in the same grave as Delius.

== Music ==
=== Influences ===
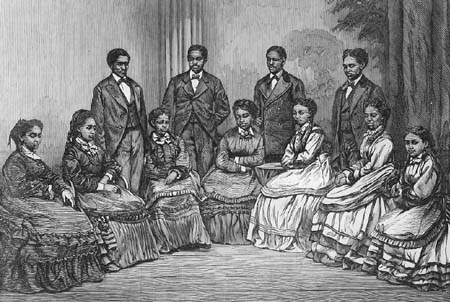
The Fisk Jubilee Singers, portrayed during a European tour in the 1870s

After the 1929 London festival, The Times music critic wrote that Delius "belongs to no school, follows no tradition and is like no other composer in the form, content or style of his music". This "extremely individual and personal idiom" was, however, the product of a long musical apprenticeship, during which the composer absorbed many influences. The earliest significant experiences in his artistic development came, Delius later asserted, from the sounds of the plantation songs carried down the river to him at Solano Grove. It was this singing, he told Fenby, that first gave him the urge to express himself in music; thus, writes Fenby, many of Delius's early works are "redolent of Negro hymnology and folk-song", a sound "not heard before in the orchestra, and seldom since". Delius's familiarity with "black" music possibly predates his American adventures; during the 1870s a popular singing group, the Fisk Jubilee Singers from Nashville, Tennessee, toured Britain and Europe, giving several well-received concerts in Bradford. When Delius wrote to Elgar in 1933 of the "beautiful four-part harmonies" of the black plantation workers, he may have been unconsciously alluding to the spirituals sung by the Fisk group.

At Leipzig, Delius became a fervent disciple of Wagner, whose technique of continuous music he sought to master. An ability to construct long musical paragraphs is, according to the Delius scholar Christopher Palmer, Delius's lasting debt to Wagner, from whom he also acquired a knowledge of chromatic harmonic technique, "an endlessly proliferating sensuousness of sound". Grieg, however, was perhaps the composer who influenced him more than any other. The Norwegian composer, like Delius, found his primary inspiration in nature and in folk-melodies, and was the stimulus for the Norwegian flavour that characterises much of Delius's early music. The music writer Anthony Payne observes that Grieg's "airy texture and non-developing use of chromaticism showed [Delius] how to lighten the Wagnerian load". Early in his career Delius drew inspiration from Chopin, later from his own contemporaries Ravel and Richard Strauss, and from the much younger Percy Grainger, who first brought the tune of Brigg Fair to Delius's notice.

According to Palmer, it is arguable that Delius gained his sense of direction as a composer from his French contemporary Claude Debussy. Palmer identifies aesthetic similarities between the two, and points to several parallel characteristics and enthusiasms. Both were inspired early in their careers by Grieg, both admired Chopin; they are also linked in their musical depictions of the sea, and in their uses of the wordless voice. The opening of Brigg Fair is described by Palmer as "perhaps the most Debussian moment in Delius". Debussy, in a review of Delius's Two Danish Songs for soprano and orchestra given in a concert on 16 March 1901, wrote: "They are very sweet, very pale – music to soothe convalescents in well-to-do neighbourhoods". Delius admired the French composer's orchestration, but thought his works lacking in melody – the latter a comment frequently directed against Delius's own music. Fenby, however, draws attention to Delius's "flights of melodic poetic-prose", while conceding that the composer was contemptuous of public taste, of "giving the public what they wanted" in the form of pretty tunes.

=== Stylistic development ===
From the conventional forms of his early music, over the course of his creative career Delius developed a style easily recognisable and "unlike the work of any other", according to Payne. As he gradually found his voice, Delius replaced the methods developed during his creative infancy with a more mature style in which Payne discerns "an increasing richness of chord structure, bearing with it its own subtle means of contrast and development". Hubert Foss, the Oxford University Press's musical editor during the 1920s and 1930s, writes that rather than creating his music from the known possibilities of instruments, Delius "thought the sounds first" and then sought the means for producing these particular sounds. Delius's full stylistic maturity dates from around 1907, when he began to write the series of works on which his main reputation rests. In the more mature works Foss observes Delius's increasing rejection of conventional forms such as sonata or concerto; Delius's music, he comments, is "certainly not architectural; nearer to painting, especially to the pointilliste style of design". The painting analogy is echoed by Cardus.

==== Towards recognition ====
Delius's first orchestral compositions were, in Christopher Palmer's words, the work of "an insipid if charming water-colourist". The Florida Suite (1887, revised 1889) is "an expertly crafted synthesis of Grieg and Negroid Americana", while Delius's first opera Irmelin (1890–1892) lacks any identifiably Delian passages. Its harmony and modulation are conventional, and the work bears the clear fingerprints of Wagner and Grieg. Payne asserts that none of the works prior to 1895 are of lasting interest. The first noticeable stylistic advance is evident in Koanga (1895–1897), with richer chords and faster harmonic rhythms; here we find Delius "feeling his way towards the vein that he was soon to tap so surely". In Paris (1899), the orchestration owes a debt to Richard Strauss; its passages of quiet beauty, says Payne, nevertheless lack the deep personal involvement of the later works. Paris, the final work of Delius's apprentice years, is described by Foss as "one of the most complete, if not the greatest, of Delius's musical paintings".

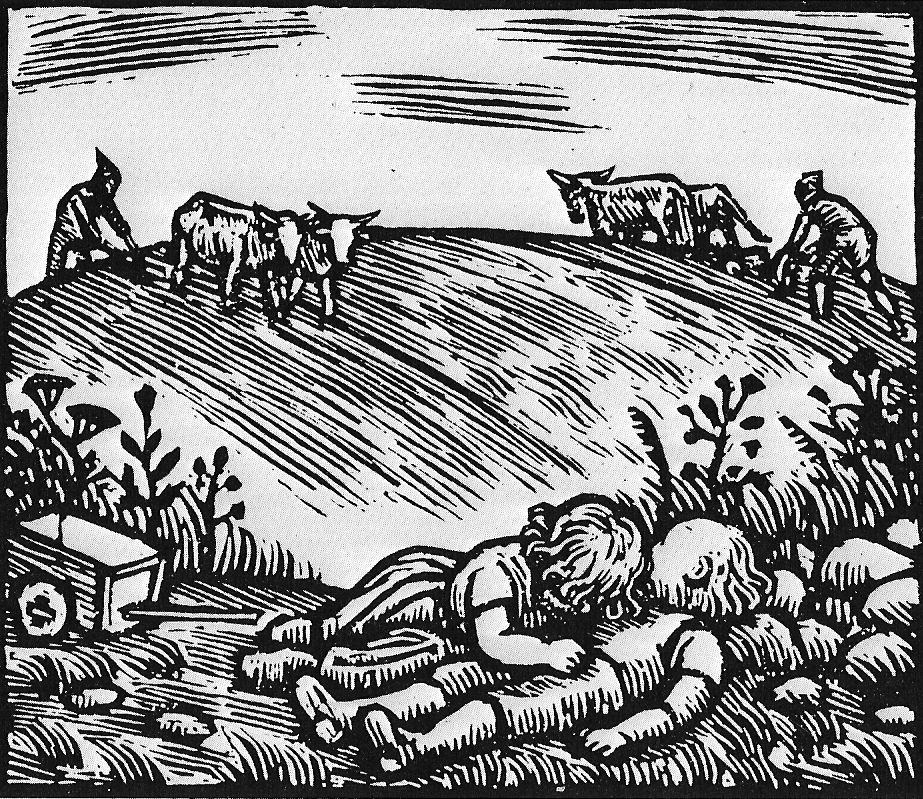
Woodcut illustration (1919) of the young lovers from Gottfried Keller's original story, which became Delius's opera A Village Romeo and Juliet

In each of the major works written in the years after Paris, Delius combined orchestral and vocal forces. The first of these works was A Village Romeo and Juliet, a music drama which departs from the normal operatic structure of acts and scenes and tells its story of tragic love in a series of tableaux. Musically it shows a considerable advance in style from the early operas of the apprentice years. The entr'acte known as "The Walk to the Paradise Garden" is described by Heseltine as showing "all the tragic beauty of mortality ... concentrated and poured forth in music of overwhelming, almost intolerable poignancy". In this work Delius begins to achieve the texture of sound that characterised all his later compositions. Delius's music is often assumed to lack melody and form. Cardus argues that melody, while not a primary factor, is there abundantly, "floating and weaving itself into the texture of shifting harmony" – a characteristic which Cardus believes is shared only by Debussy.

Delius's next work, Appalachia, introduces a further feature that recurred in later pieces – the use of the voice instrumentally in wordless singing, in this case depicting the distant plantation songs that had inspired Delius at Solano Grove. Although Payne argues that Appalachia shows only a limited advance in technique, Fenby identifies one orchestral passage as the first expression of Delius's idea of "the transitoriness of all mortal things mirrored in nature". Hereafter, whole works rather than brief passages would be informed by this idea. The transitional phase of the composer's career concludes with three further vocal pieces: Sea Drift (1903), A Mass of Life (1904–05), and Songs of Sunset (1906–07). Payne salutes each of these as masterpieces, in which the Delian style struggles to emerge in its full ripeness. Fenby describes A Mass of Life as standing outside the general progression of Delius's work, "a vast parenthesis", unlike anything else he wrote, but nevertheless an essential ingredient in his development.

==== Full flowering ====
Brigg Fair (1907) announced the composer's full stylistic maturity, the first of the pieces for orchestra that confirm Delius's status as a musical poet, with the influences of Wagner and Grieg almost entirely absent. The work was followed in the next few years by In a Summer Garden (1908), Life's Dance, Summer Night on the River (both 1911) and On Hearing the First Cuckoo in Spring (1912). The critic R. W. S. Mendl described this sequence as "exquisite nature studies", with a unity and shape lacking in the earlier formal tone poems. These works became part of the standard English concert repertory, and helped to establish the character of Delius's music in the English concert-goer's mind, although according to Ernest Newman, the concentration on these works to the neglect of his wider output may have done Delius as much harm as good. The typical mature Delian orchestral sound is apparent in these works, through the division of the strings into ten or more sections, punctuated by woodwind comments and decorations. In the North Country Sketches of 1913–14, Delius divides the strings into 12 parts, and harps, horns, clarinets and bassoons evoke a lifeless winter scene. In Payne's view, the Sketches are the high-water mark of Delius's compositional skill, although Fenby awards the accolade to the later Eventyr (Once Upon a Time) (1917).

During this period Delius did not confine himself to purely orchestral works; he produced his final opera, Fennimore and Gerda (1908–1910), like A Village Romeo and Juliet written in tableau form, but in his mature style. His choral works of the period, notably An Arabesque and A Song of the High Hills (both 1911) are among the most radical of Delius's writings in their juxtapositions of unrelated chords. The latter work, entirely wordless, contains some of the most difficult choral music in existence, according to Heseltine. After 1915, Delius turned his attention to traditional sonata, chamber and concerto forms, which he had largely left alone since his apprentice days. Of these pieces Payne highlights two: the Violin Concerto (1916), as an example of how, writing in unfamiliar genres, Delius remained stylistically true to himself; and the Cello Sonata of 1917, which, lacking the familiarity of an orchestral palate, becomes a melodic triumph. Cardus's verdict, however, is that Delius's chamber and concerto works are largely failures. After 1917, according to Payne, there was a general deterioration in the quantity and quality of Delius's output as illness took hold, although Payne exempts the incidental music to Hassan (1920–1923) from condemnation, believing it to contain some of Delius's best work.

==== Final phase ====
The four-year association with Fenby from 1929 produced two major works, and several smaller pieces often drawn from unpublished music from Delius's early career. The first of the major works was the orchestral A Song of Summer, based on sketches that Delius had previously collected under the title of A Poem of Life and Love. In dictating the new beginning of this work, Delius asked Fenby to "imagine that we are sitting on the cliffs in the heather, looking out over the sea". This does not, says Fenby, indicate that the dictation process was calm and leisurely; the mood was usually frenzied and nerve-racking. The other major work, a setting of Walt Whitman poems with the title Songs of Farewell, was an even more alarming prospect to Fenby: "the complexity of thinking in so many strands, often all at once; the problems of orchestral and vocal balance; the wider area of possible misunderstandings ..." combined to leave Delius and his helper exhausted after each session of work – yet both these works were ready for performance in 1932. Of the music in this final choral work, Beecham wrote of its "hard, masculine vigour, reminiscent in mood and fibre of some of the great choral passages in A Mass of Life". Payne describes the work as "bracing and exultant, with in places an almost Holstian clarity".

=== Reception ===
Recognition came late to Delius; before 1899, when he was already 37, his works were largely unpublished and unknown to the public. When the symphonic poem Paa Vidderne was performed at Monte Carlo on 25 February 1894 in a programme of works from British composers, The Musical Times listed the composers as "... Balfe, Mackenzie, Oakeley, Sullivan ... and one Delius, whoever he may be". The work was well received in Monte Carlo, and brought the composer a congratulatory letter from Princess Alice of Monaco, but this did not lead to demands for further performances of this or other Delius works. Some of his individual songs (he wrote more than 60) were occasionally included in vocal recitals; referring to "the strange songs of Fritz Delius", The Times critic expressed regret "that the powers the composer undoubtedly possesses should not be turned to better account or undergo proper development at the hands of some musician competent to train them".

St James's Hall, London, the venue for Delius's first London concert, May 1899

Of the May 1899 concert at St. James's Hall, London, The Musical Times reviewer remarked on the rawness of some of the music, but praised the "boldness of conception and virile strength that command and hold attention". Beecham, however, records that despite this "fair show of acclaim", for all the impetus it gave to future performances of Delius's work the event might never have happened; none of the music was heard again in England for many years. Delius was much better received in Germany, where a series of successful performances of his works led to what Beecham describes as a Delius vogue there, "second only to that of Richard Strauss".

In England, a performance of the Piano Concerto on 22 October 1907 at the Queen's Hall was praised for the brilliance of the soloist, Theodor Szántó, and for the power of the music itself. From that point onwards the music of Delius became increasingly familiar to both British and European audiences, as performances of his works proliferated. Beecham's presentation of A Mass of Life at the Queen's Hall in June 1909 did not inspire Hans Haym, who had come from Elberfeld for the concert, though Beecham says that many professional and amateur musicians thought it "the most impressive and original achievement of its genre written in the last fifty years" Some reviewers continued to doubt the popular appeal of Delius's music, while others were more specifically hostile. (Note: The Observer wrote of "a charm and fascination entirely its own ... but whether his contemplative and reticent musical spirit will ever make an appeal to the great public is another question". Samuel Langford in The Manchester Guardian wrote that Delius's music had "the modern note without the ancient form and grace. The instruments come in, as it were, anywhere, like little toy reeds pulled by some childish Pan.")

From 1910, Delius's works began to be heard in America: Brigg Fair and In a Summer Garden were performed in 1910–11 by the New York Philharmonic Orchestra under Walter Damrosch. In November 1915 Grainger gave the first American performance of the Piano Concerto, again with the New York Philharmonic. The New York Times critic described the work as uneven; richly harmonious, but combining colour and beauty with effects "of an almost crass unskillfulness and ugliness".

For the rest of his lifetime Delius's more popular pieces were performed in England and abroad, often under the sponsorship of Beecham, who was primarily responsible for the Delius festival in October–November 1929. In a retrospective comment on the festival The Times critic wrote of full houses and an apparent enthusiasm for "music which hitherto has enjoyed no exceptional vogue", but wondered whether this new acceptance was based on a solid foundation. After Delius's death Beecham continued to promote his works; a second festival was held in 1946, and a third (after Beecham's death) at Bradford in 1962, to celebrate the centenary of Delius's birth. These occasions were in the face of a general indifference to the music; writing in the centenary year, the musicologist Deryck Cooke opined that at that time, "to declare oneself a confirmed Delian is hardly less self-defamatory than to admit to being an addict of cocaine and marihuana".

Beecham had died in 1961, and Fenby writes that it "seemed to many then that nothing could save Delius's music from extinction", such was the conductor's unique mastery over the music. However, other conductors have continued to advocate Delius, and since the centenary year, the Delius Society has pursued the aim of "develop[ing] a greater knowledge of the life and works of Delius". The music has never become fashionable, a fact often acknowledged by promoters and critics. (Note: Deryck Cooke chose the title "Delius the Unknown" for his December 1962 address to the Royal Musical Association, recognising, Cooke says, the extent to which the composer was out of fashion. In 1991 the sleeve note of the Naxos recording of the Violin Concerto and other works ends: "Delius is now out of fashion, for our times do not favour art that is never vulgar, never strident." In a comment on the BBC Symphony Orchestra's projected October 2010 Elgar and Delius concert at London's Barbican Centre, the critic David Nice observes that while Elgar is in vogue, Delius is "desperately out of fashion".) To suggestions that Delius's music is an "acquired taste", Fenby answers: "The music of Delius is not an acquired taste. One either likes it the moment one first hears it, or the sound of it is once and for ever distasteful to one. It is an art which will never enjoy an appeal to the many, but one which will always be loved, and dearly loved, by the few." Writing in 2004 on the 70th anniversary of Delius's death, the Guardian journalist Martin Kettle recalls Cardus arguing in 1934 that Delius as a composer was unique, both in his technique and in his emotionalism. Although he eschewed classical formalism, it was wrong, Cardus believed, to regard Delius merely as "a tone-painter, an impressionist or a maker of programme music". His music's abiding feature is, Cardus wrote, that it "recollects emotion in tranquillity ... Delius is always reminding us that beauty is born by contemplation after the event".

== Memorials and legacy ==
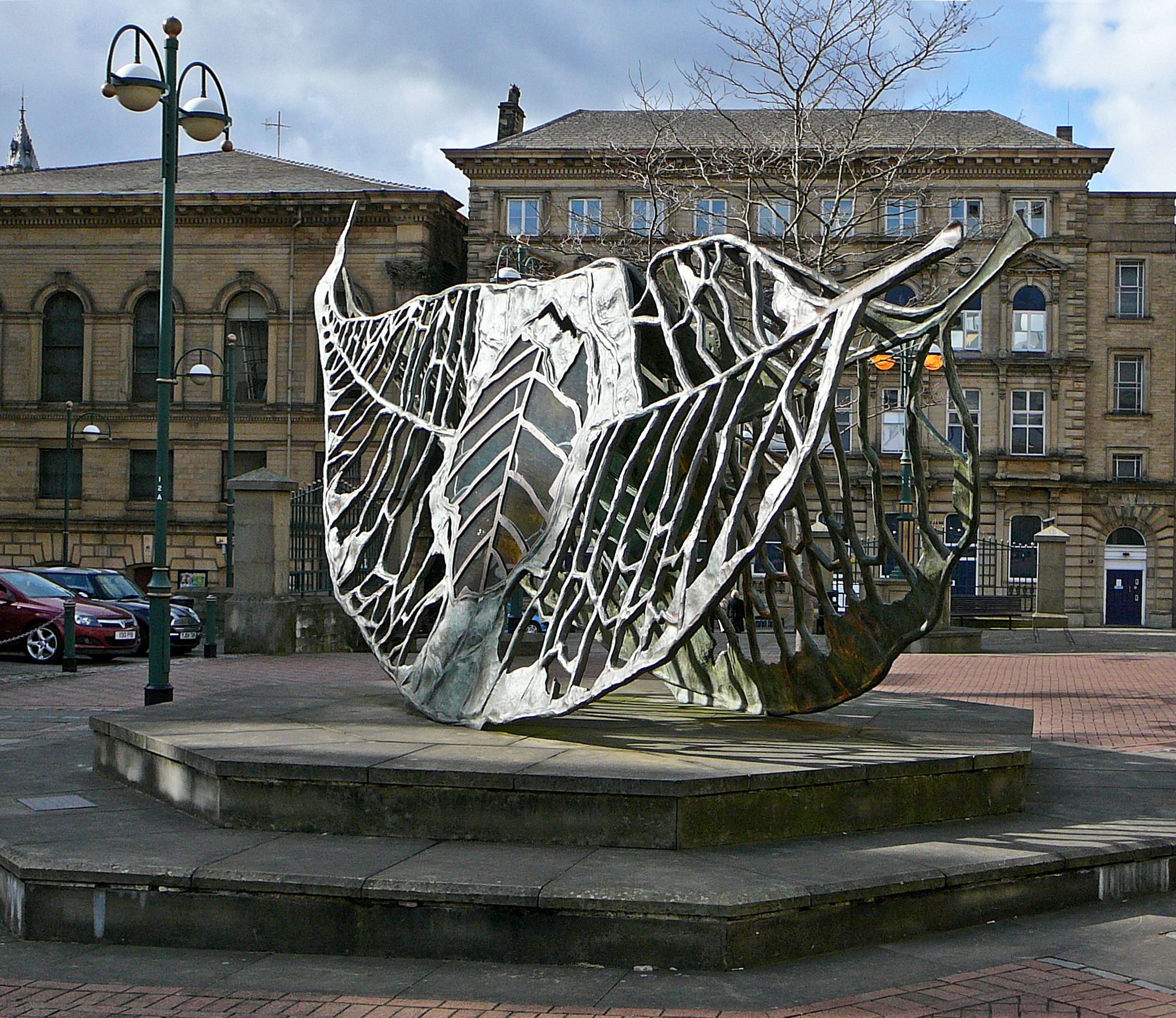
The sculpture A Quatrefoil for Delius, by Amber Hiscott, unveiled in Delius's honour, in Exchange Square, Bradford, on 23 November 1993

Just before his death, Delius prepared a codicil to his will whereby the royalties on future performances of his music would be used to support an annual concert of works by young composers. Delius died before this provision could be legally effected; Fenby says that Beecham then persuaded Jelka in her own will to abandon the concerts idea and apply the royalties towards the editing and recording of Delius's main works. After Jelka's death in 1935 the Delius Trust was established, to supervise this task. As stipulated in Jelka's will, the Trust operated largely under Beecham's direction. After Beecham's death in 1961 advisers were appointed to assist the trustees, and in 1979 the administration of the Trust was taken over by the Musicians' Benevolent Fund. Over the years the Trust's objectives have been extended so that it can promote the music of other composers who were Delius's contemporaries. The Trust is a co-sponsor of the Royal Philharmonic Society's Composition Prize for young composers.

Herbert Stothart made arrangements of Delius's music, particularly Appalachia, for the 1946 film The Yearling.

In 1962, enthusiasts for Delius's music who had gone to Bradford for the centenary festival formed the Delius Society; Fenby became its first president. With around 400 members, the Society is independent from the Trust, but works closely with it. Its general objectives are the furtherance of knowledge of Delius's life and works, and the encouragement of performances and recordings. In 2004, as a stimulus for young musicians to study and perform Delius's music, the Society established an annual Delius Prize competition, with a prize of £1,000 to the winner. In June 1984, at the Grand Theatre, Leeds, the Delius Trust sponsored a commemorative production of A Village Romeo and Juliet by Opera North, to mark the 50th anniversary of Delius's death.

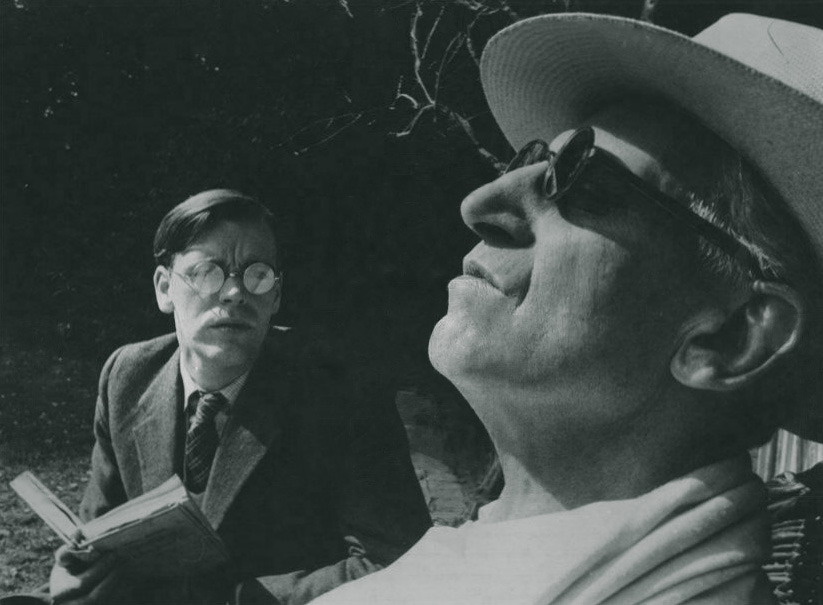
Ken Russell's Song of Summer with Max Adrian as Delius, right, and Christopher Gable as Eric Fenby

Public interest in Delius's life was stimulated in the UK in 1968, with the showing of the Ken Russell film Song of Summer on BBC Television. The film depicted the years of the Delius–Fenby collaboration; Fenby co-scripted with Russell. Max Adrian played Delius, with Christopher Gable as Fenby and Maureen Pryor as Jelka.

In America, a small memorial to Delius stands in Solano Grove. The Delius Association of Florida has for many years organised an annual festival at Jacksonville, to mark the composer's birthday. At Jacksonville University, the Music Faculty awards an annual Delius Composition Prize. In February 2012 Delius was one of ten prominent Britons honoured by the Royal Mail in the "Britons of Distinction" stamps set.

Beecham stresses Delius's role as an innovator: "The best of Delius is undoubtedly to be found in those works where he disregarded classical traditions and created his own forms". Fenby echoes this: "the people who really count are those who discover new ways of making our lives more beautiful. Frederick Delius was such a man". Palmer writes that Delius's true legacy is the ability of his music to inspire the creative urge in its listeners and to enhance their awareness of the wonders of life. Palmer concludes by invoking George Eliot's poem The Choir Invisible: "Frederick Delius ... belongs to the company of those true artists for whose life and work the world is a better place to live in, and of whom surely is composed, in a literal sense, 'the choir invisible/Whose music is the gladness of the world'".

== Recordings ==
The first recordings of Delius's works, in 1927, were conducted by Beecham for the Columbia label: the "Walk to the Paradise Garden" interlude from A Village Romeo and Juliet, and On Hearing the First Cuckoo in Spring, performed by the orchestra of the Royal Philharmonic Society. These began a long series of Delius recordings under Beecham that continued for the rest of the conductor's life. He was not alone, however; Geoffrey Toye in 1929–30 recorded Brigg Fair, In a Summer Garden, Summer Night on the River and the "Walk to the Paradise Garden". Fenby recounts that on his first day in Grez, Jelka played Beecham's First Cuckoo recording. In May 1934, when Delius was close to death, Fenby played him Toye's In a Summer Garden, the last music, Fenby says, that Delius ever heard. By the end of the 1930s Beecham had issued versions for Columbia of most of the main orchestral and choral works, together with several songs in which he accompanied the soprano Dora Labbette on the piano. By 1936 Columbia and His Master's Voice (HMV) had issued recordings of Violin Sonatas 1 and 2, the Elegy and Caprice, and of some of the shorter works.

Full recordings of the operas were not available until after the Second World War. Once again Beecham, now with the HMV label, led the way, with A Village Romeo and Juliet in 1948, performed by the new Royal Philharmonic Orchestra and Chorus. Later versions of this work include those of Meredith Davies for EMI in 1971, Charles Mackerras for Argo in 1989, and a German-language version conducted by Klauspeter Seibel in 1995. Beecham's former protégé Norman Del Mar recorded a complete Irmelin for BBC Digital in 1985. In 1997 EMI reissued Meredith Davies's 1976 recording of Fennimore and Gerda, which Richard Hickox conducted in German the same year for Chandos. Recordings of all the major works, and of many of the individual songs, have been issued at regular intervals since the Second World War. Many of these recordings have been issued in conjunction with the Delius Society, which has prepared various discographies of Delius's recorded music. (Note: See, for example, Delius: a discography compiled by Stuart Upton and Malcolm Walker The Delius Society, 1969. Also Recordings of Music By Delius The Delius Society, 2000)

== Sources ==
- Beecham, Thomas (1944). A Mingled Chime—Leaves from an Autobiography. London: Hutchinson. OCLC 592569600.
- Beecham, Thomas (1975) [First published by Hutchinson & Co. in 1959]. Frederick Delius. Sutton, Surrey: Severn House. ISBN 0-7278-0099-X.
- Cardus, Neville (1947). Autobiography. London: Collins. OCLC 459080138.
- Fenby, Eric (1971). The Great Composers: Delius. London: Faber and Faber. ISBN 0-571-09296-9.
- Fenby, Eric (1981) [Originally published by G Bell & Sons, 1936]. Delius As I Knew Him. London: Faber and Faber. ISBN 0-571-11836-4.
- Hull, Robert H. (1928). Delius. London: Hogarth Press.
- Jacobs, Arthur (1994). Henry J. Wood: Maker of the Proms. London: Methuen. ISBN 0-413-69340-6.
- March, Ivan, ed. (1993). The Penguin Guide to Opera on Compact Discs. London: Penguin Books. ISBN 0-14-046957-5.
- Palmer, Christopher (1976). Delius: Portrait of a Cosmopolitan. London: Duckworth. ISBN 0-7156-0773-1.
- Redwood, Christopher (1976). A Delius Companion: A 70th birthday tribute to Eric Fenby. John Calder. ISBN 0-7145-3826-4.
- Reid, Charles (1961). Thomas Beecham – An Independent Biography. London: Victor Gollancz. OCLC 52025268.
- Young, Rob (2011). Electric Eden: Unearthing Britain's Visionary Music. London: Macmillan. ISBN 0865478562.
