= Alfred Cassirer =

German engineer, entrepreneur and art collector

- Cassirer with his daughter Eva Cassirer
- Born: 29 July 1875; Görlitz
- Died: 11 July 1932 (aged 56); Berlin, Germany
- Resting place: Friedhof Heerstraße
- Children: Eva Cassirer
- Relatives: Paul Cassirer and Richard Cassirer (brothers), Julius Cassirer (uncle)

Alfred Cassirer (29 July 1875 – 11 July 1932) was a German engineer, entrepreneur and art collector.

== Life ==
Born in Görlitz, Cassirer came from the entrepreneurial German-Jewish Cassirer family and was the youngest son of Louis Cassirer and a brother of Paul, Hugo and Richard Cassirer. Together, with his brother Hugo Cassirer and his uncle Julius Cassirer, they owned the company Kabelwerk Dr. Cassirer und Co. in Berlin-Hakenfelde. Cassirer was also the second representative of Section I of the "Maschinenbau- und Kleineisenindustrie-Berufsgenossenschaft".

He was also an active hot air ballooner, co-founder of the Kaiserlicher Aero-Club at the Johannisthal Air Field near Berlin and won 1st prize in Class 3 in the 1908 International Race with his balloon "Hewald" in the endurance flight. He was also a co-partner of the Motorluftschiff-Studiengesellschaft.

On 15 July 1912, Alfred Cassirer married Hannah Sotschek (1887-1974), who, after divorcing around 1923, married Leo Blumenreich in a second marriage. The marriage produced the philosopher and astronomer Eva Cassirer (1920-2009).

== Art collection ==
Cassirer was a art collector and decreed testamentarially that his entire collection was to be given to the Magistrat von Berlin to be given to the Märkisches Museum as a permanent loan. From March 1933, it was presented in five rooms on the first floor of the Ermelerhaus, a branch of the Märkisches Museum, Breite Straße 11 in Mitte.

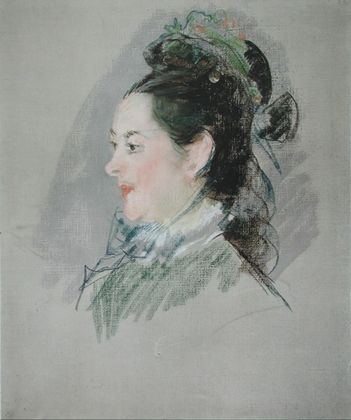
Édouard Manet: Femme au Chapeau à Brides, 1881, today Baltimore Museum of Art

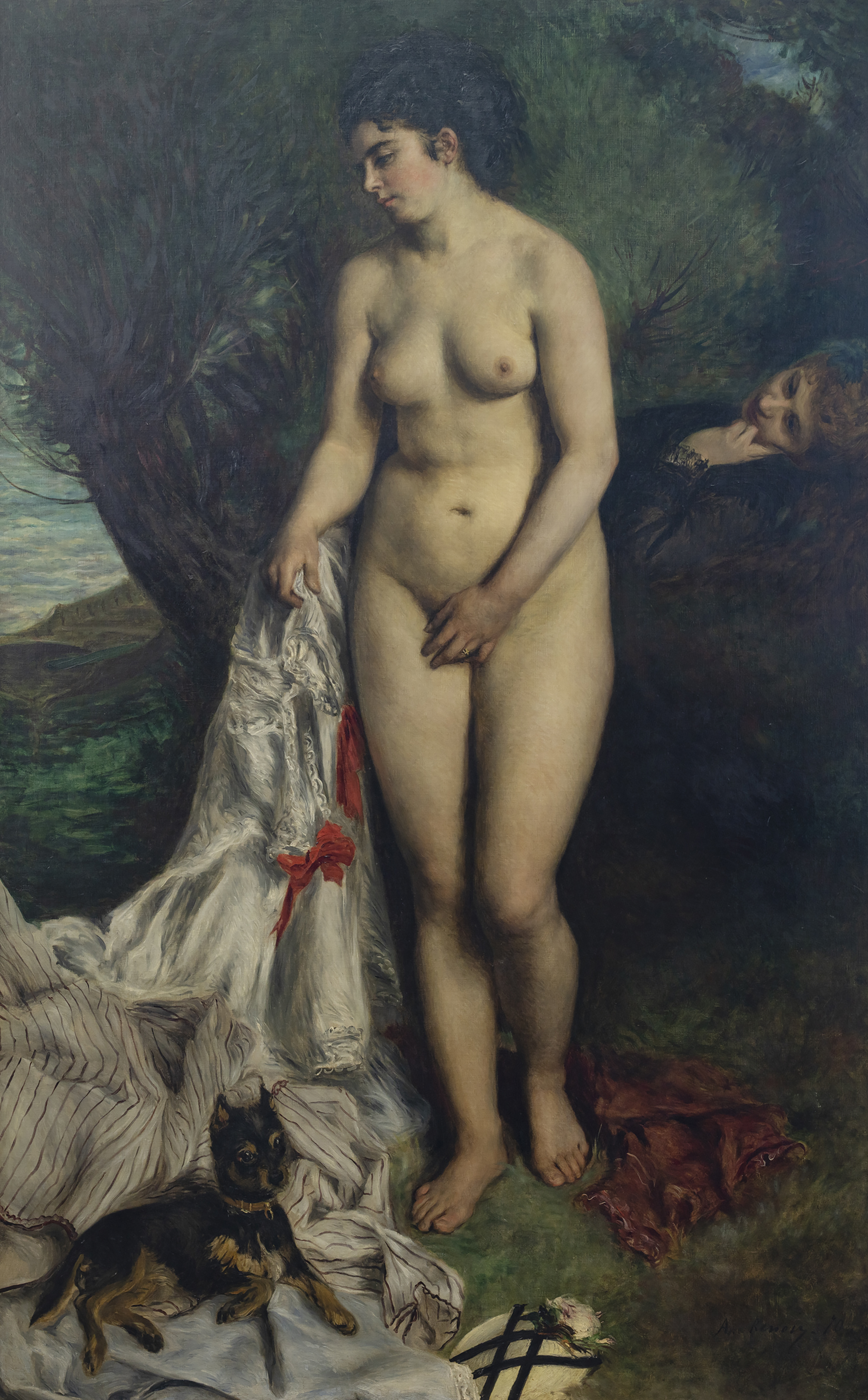
Pierre-Auguste Renoir: Badende, 1870, today Museu de Arte de São Paulo

Max Liebermann: Selbstporträt, 1915, today Alte Nationalgalerie

Cassirer's grave in Friedhof Heerstraße

The works on display included drawings by Adolph von Menzel, works by Max Liebermann and Max Slevogt, sculptures by Ernst Barlach, Georg Kolbe and August Gaul. Among the main works in the collection were paintings by French artists such as Gustave Courbet, Édouard Manet, Claude Monet, Edgar Degas, Pierre-Auguste Renoir, Camille Pissarro, Alfred Sisley and Paul Cézanne.

== Later life ==
Cassirer died at age 56 on 11 July 1932 in Berlin. His grave is located in the state-owned Friedhof Heerstraße in Berlin-Westend. The grave monument consists of an unadorned plinth, consisting of three dimension stones from shell limestone, on which stands a relief showing six grazing sheep. This frieze was created by the firm Schleicher & Co. after a drawing by August Gaul entitled "Sheep in the Campagna".
