= Cassirer =

Cassirer is a surname of Yiddish origin (קאַסירער kasirer, which means Cashier; Kassierer). Notable people with the surname include:

- Wilfred Cass, born Wolfgang Cassirer (1924–2022), German-Jewish founder of Cass Sculpture Foundation
- Bruno Cassirer (1872–1941), German-Jewish publisher and gallery owner in Berlin
- Ernst Cassirer (1874–1945), German-Jewish philosopher
- Fritz Cassirer (1871–1926), German-Jewish conductor
- Heinz Cassirer (1903–1979), German-Jewish philosopher
- Julius Cassirer (1841–1924), German-Jewish industrialist and art collector
- Paul Cassirer (1871–1926), German-Jewish art dealer and editor
- Richard Cassirer (1868–1925), German-Jewish neurologist

== See also ==
- Jerome P. Kassirer (born 1932), American nephrologist
