= Jean-Louis Forain =

French painter (1852–1931)

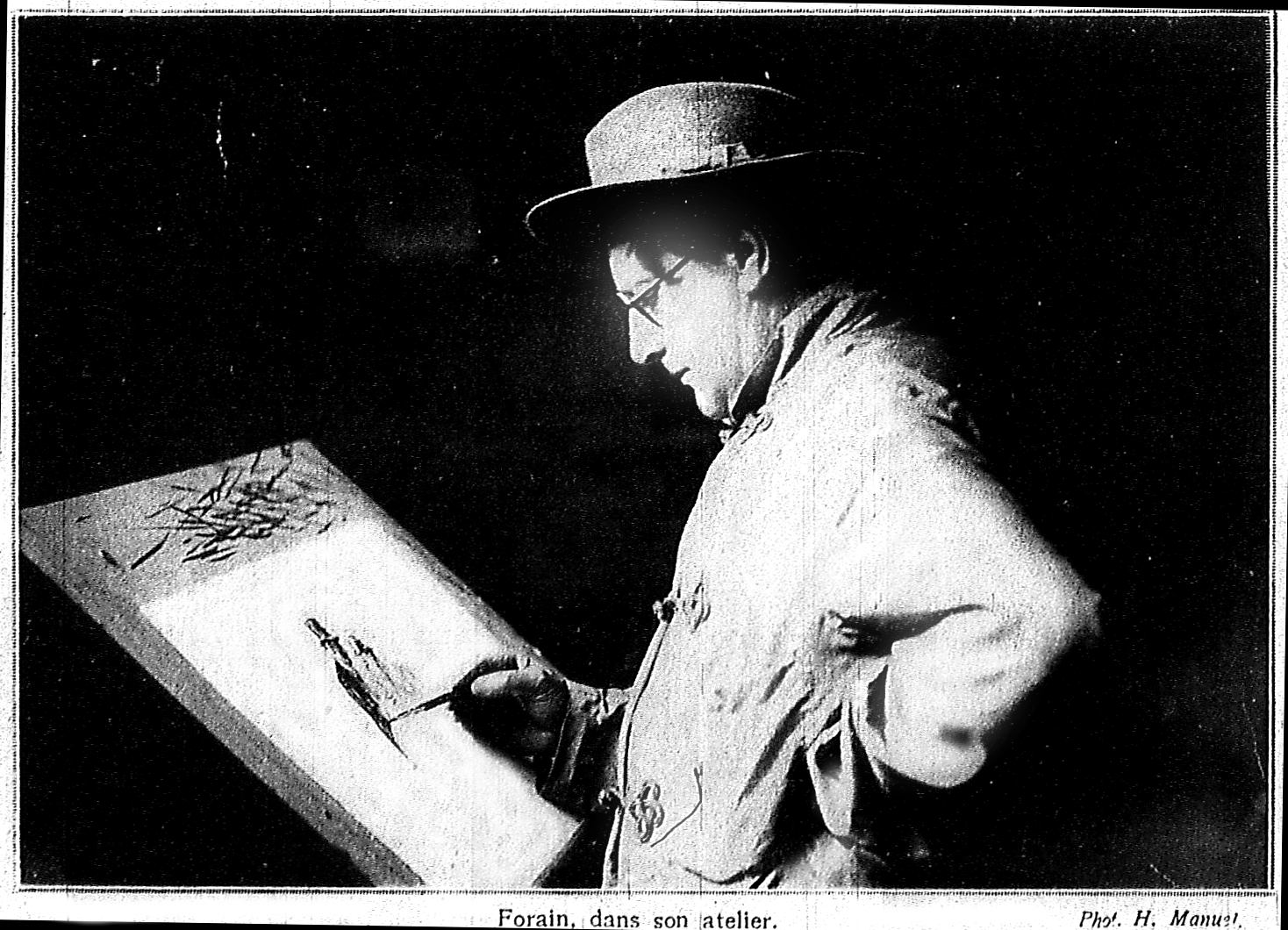
- Jean-Louis Forain drawing in his studio
- Born: Louis Henri Forain; 23 October 1852; Reims, France
- Died: 11 July 1931 (aged 78); Paris, France
- Spouse: Jeanne Bosc
- Elected: Royal Academy of Arts

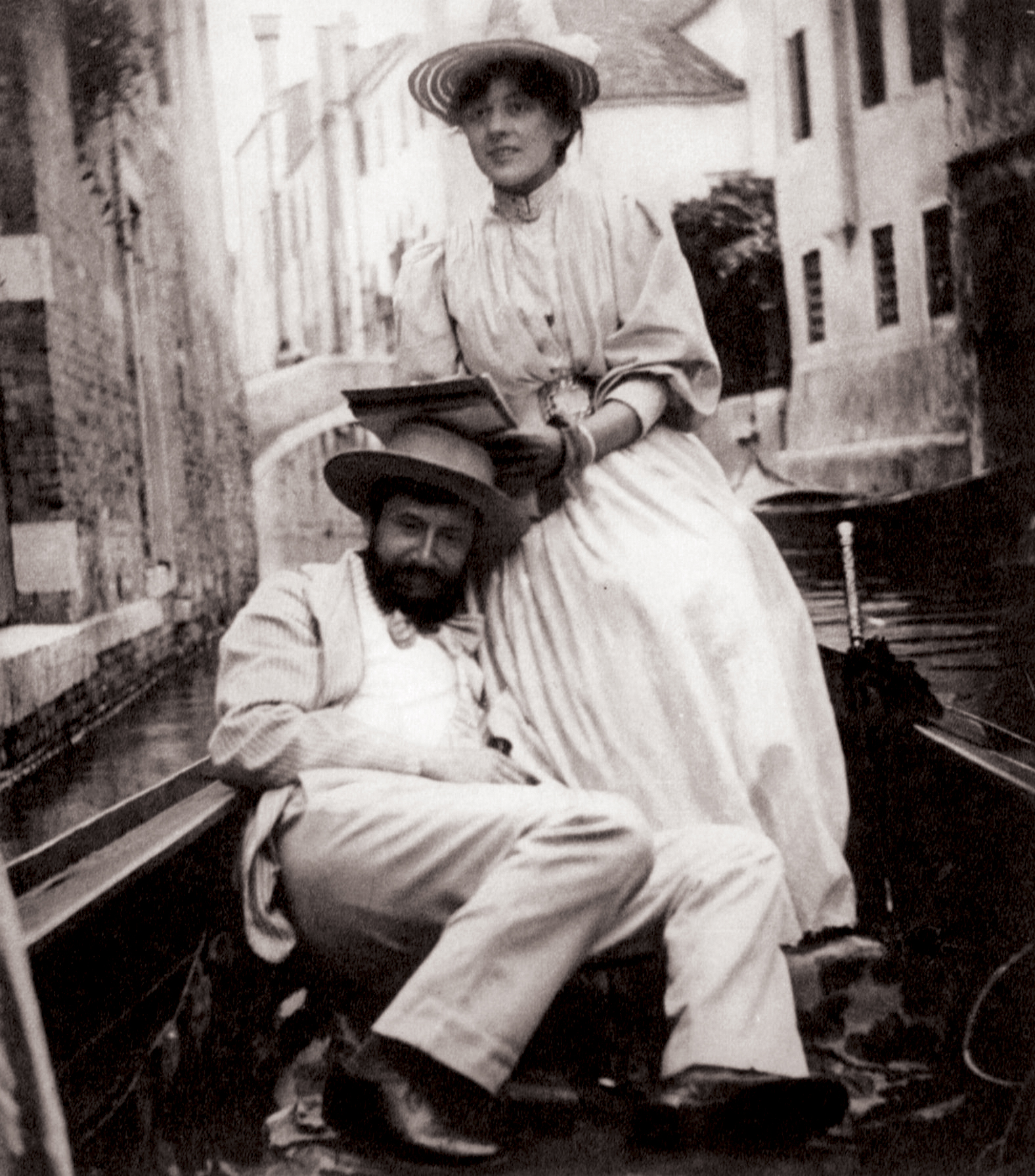
Photograph of Jean-Louis Forain and Jeanne Bosc in a Venetian Gondola

Jean-Louis Forain (French pronunciation: [ʒɑ̃ lwi fɔʁɛ̃]; 23 October 1852 – 11 July 1931) was a French Impressionist painter and printmaker, working in media including oils, watercolour, pastel, etching and lithograph. Compared to many of his Impressionist colleagues, he was more successful during his lifetime, but his reputation is now much less exalted.

== Life and work ==
Forain was born in Reims, Marne but at age eight, his family moved to Paris. He began his career working as a caricaturist for several Paris journals including Le Monde Parisien and Le rire satirique. Wanting to expand his horizons, he enrolled at the École des Beaux Arts, studying under Jean-Léon Gérôme as well as another sculptor/painter, Jean-Baptiste Carpeaux.

Forain's quick and often biting wit allowed him to befriend poets Arthur Rimbaud and Paul Verlaine as well as many writers, most notably Joris-Karl Huysmans. He was one of only "seven known recipients" to receive a first edition of A Season in Hell directly from Rimbaud. He was the youngest artist to frequent and participate in the feverish debates led by Édouard Manet and Edgar Degas at the Café de la Nouvelle Athènes in Montmartre.

A follower and protégé of Degas, Forain joined the Impressionist circle in time to take part in the fourth independent exhibition in 1879; he participated in four of the eight Impressionist Exhibitions (1879, 1880, 1881 and 1886). Influenced by Impressionist theories on light and color, he depicted scenes of everyday life: his watercolors, pastels and paintings focused on Parisian popular entertainments and themes of modernity—the racetrack, the ballet, the comic opera and bustling cafés.

Forain was the most famous caricaturist of the Belle époque, and drew, among others, for the Figaro for more than 30 years. From 1898–1899 Forain worked as an illustrator for the weekly French magazine Psst...!, a satirical publication to promote the anti-Dreyfus.

Aside from being influenced by his friend of over fifty years, Edgar Degas, Forain was greatly influenced by Honoré Daumier, and his treatment of subjects in his drawings for publications such as Le Figaro and Le Courrier Francais are often reminiscent of Daumier's. In 1892 he published the first volume of La Comédie Parisienne, a collection of Forain's illustrations and commentary on the major political stories that disrupted France's Third Republic—such as the anarchic crisis and the Dreyfus affair. In 1891 Forain married the painter Jeanne Bosc with whom he had a son, Jean-Loup, born in 1895.

During the first World War, Forain's illustrations honored the patriotism of his contemporaries, and he enlisted in the Section de Camouflage under Lucien-Victor Guirand de Scévola. In his later years, Forain created numerous scenes of the Law Courts and other Parisian institutions plus social satire caricatures of late 19th and early 20th century French life.

In 1931, shortly before his death, he was made a member of the Royal Academy of Arts in London. He was one of France's most famous and revered artists during his time. He was, perhaps, most highly respected for his numerous drawings which chronicled and commented on Parisian city life at the end of the 19th century. Followers and admirers of Forain's work included Henri de Toulouse-Lautrec.

== Nazi-looted art ==
On 22 January 2020 two works by Jean-Louis Forain that had been found in the Gurlitt stash in Munich, hidden by the son of one of Hitler's art dealer's Hildebrand Gurlitt, were restituted to the heirs of the Jewish art collector Armand Dorville.

== Selected works ==
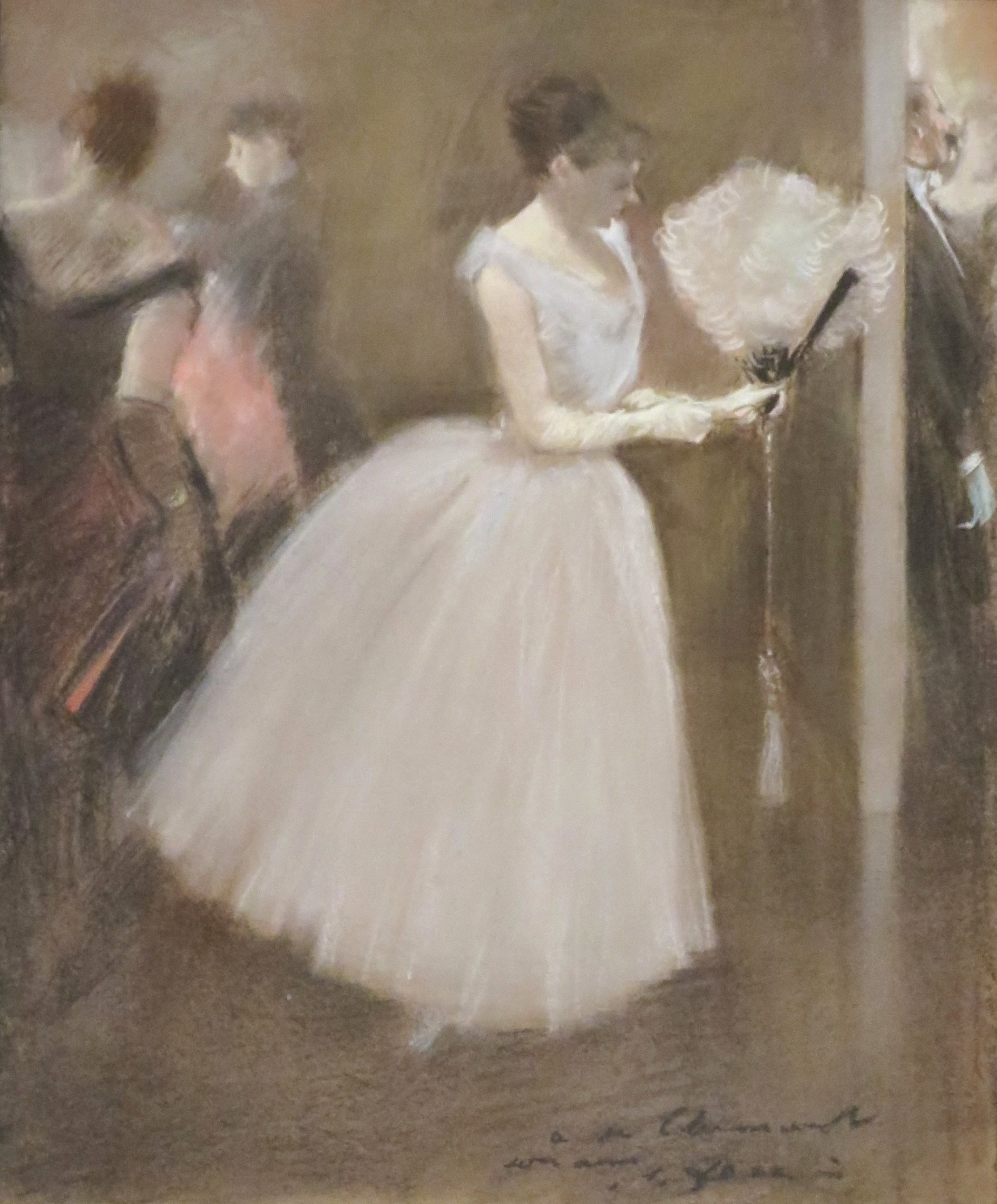
The Place Clichy, pastel, 1883–1884

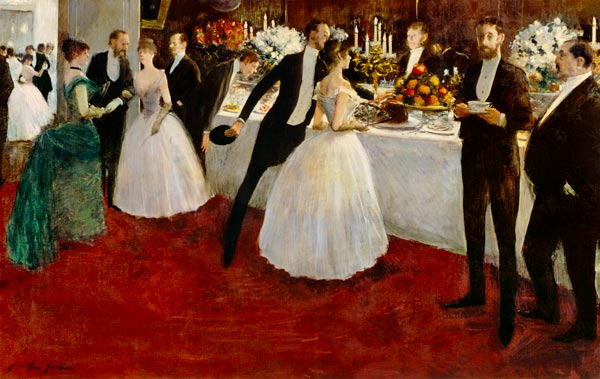
The Buffet, oil, 1884

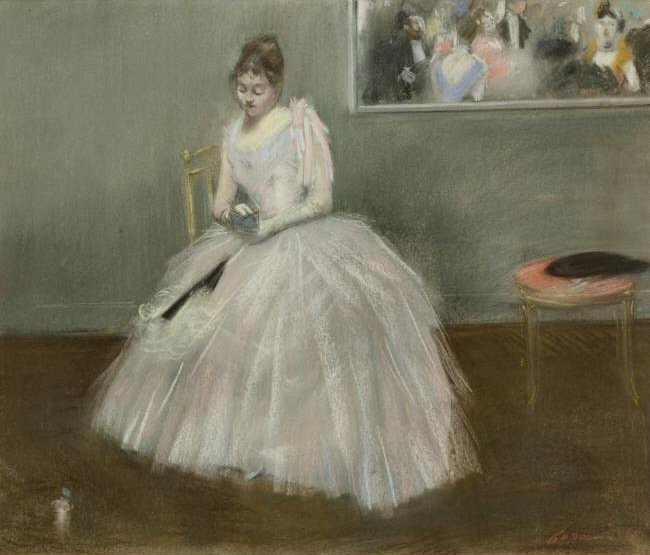
The Prom Notebook, pastel, c 1888

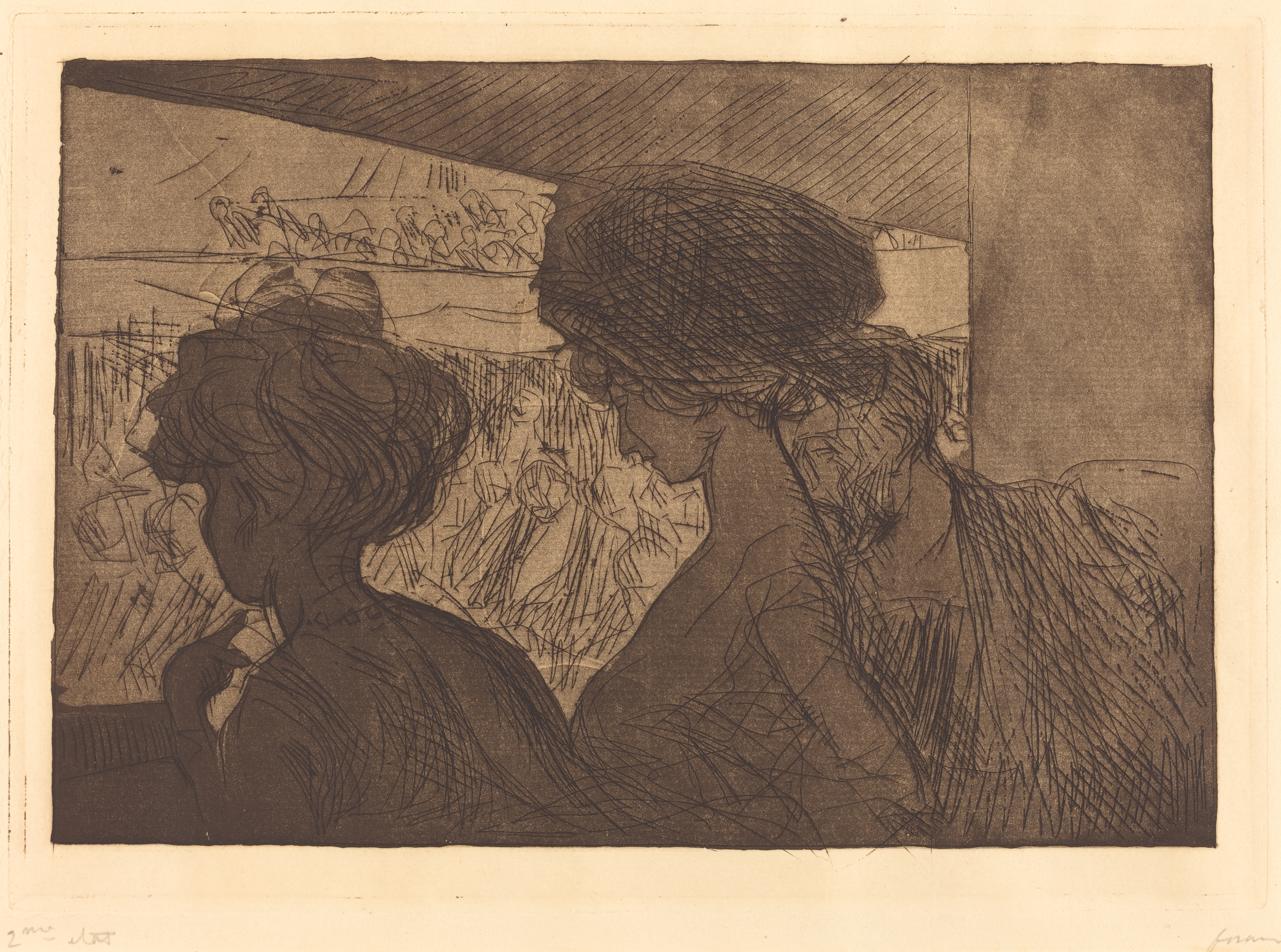
Lower Box at the Theatre, etching, 1909

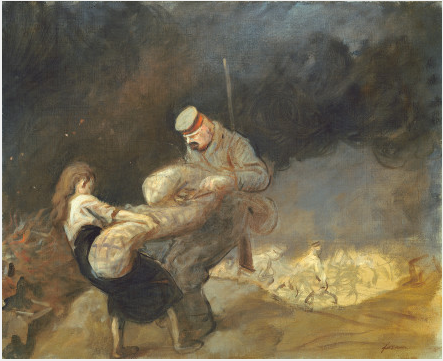
The Requisition, 1919

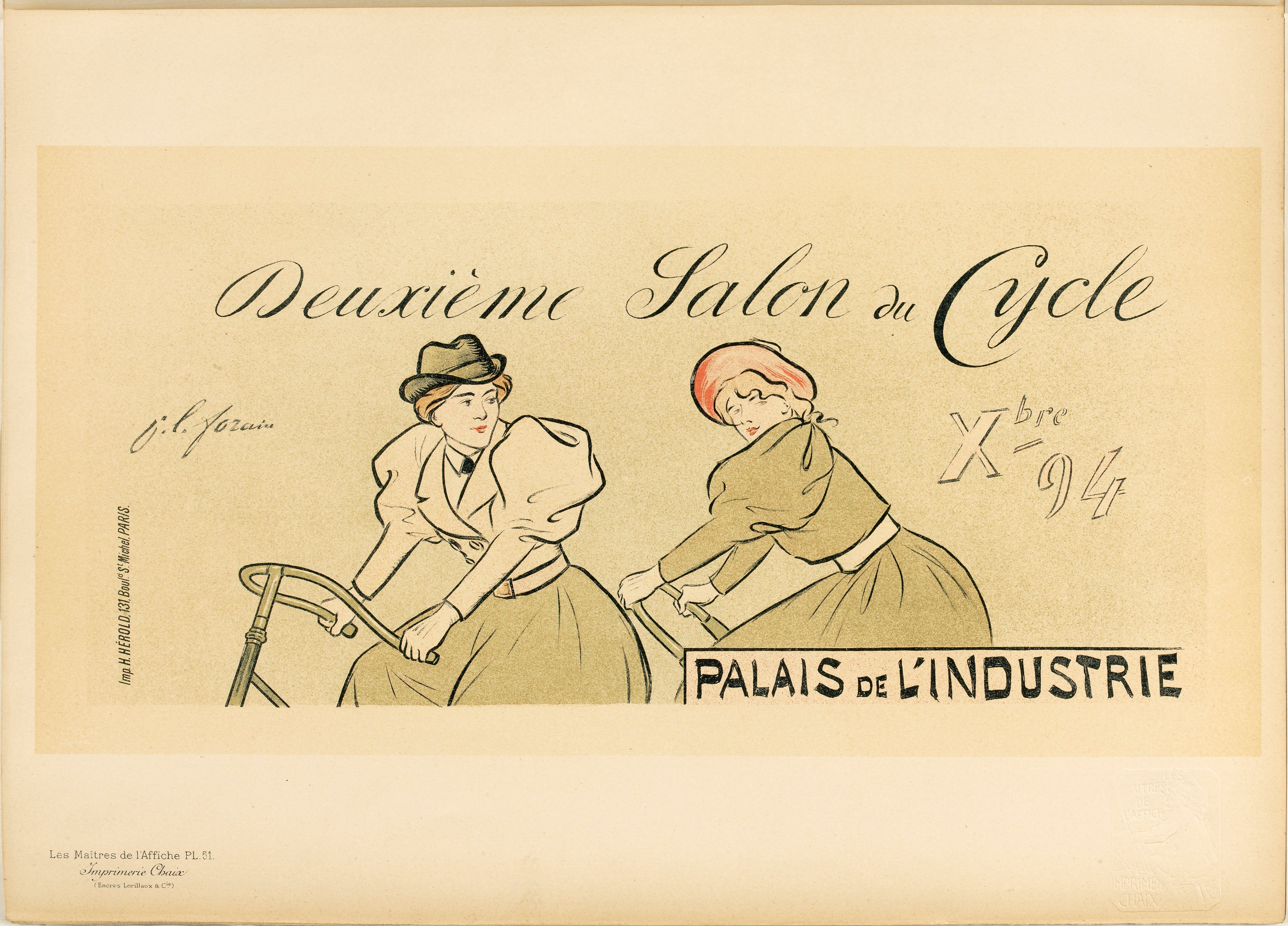
Poster 51 in Les Maîtres de l'Affiche

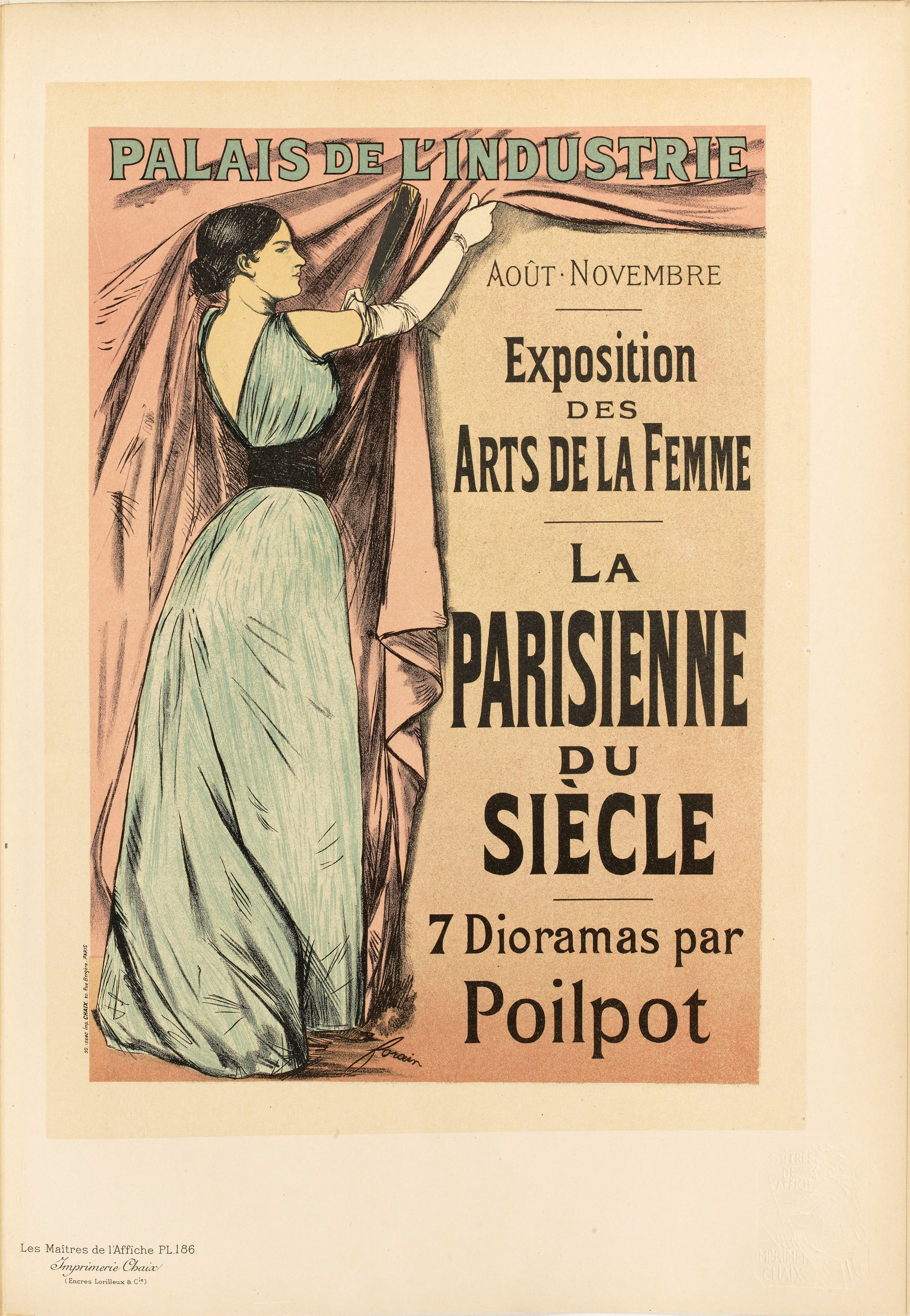
Poster 186 in Les Maîtres de l'Affiche

== Sources ==
- Jean-Louis Forain: The Impressionist Years. Exhibition Catalogue. Dixon Gallery and Gardens,1995.
- "Jean-Louis Forain: Artist, Realist, Humanist." International Exhibitions Foundation, Washington, D.C., 1982–1983.
- Robb, Graham (2000), Rimbaud, New York: W.W. Norton & Co, ISBN 978-0330482820
- Charles Kunstler, Paris, F. Rieder & cie, 1931, 63 p. contient 60 planches hors-texte en héliogravure.
- Florence Valdes-Forain, Memphis, Tennessee, U.S.A., The Dixon Gallery and Gardens, 2011 ISBN 9782759601554
