= Leo Blumenreich =

German art dealer

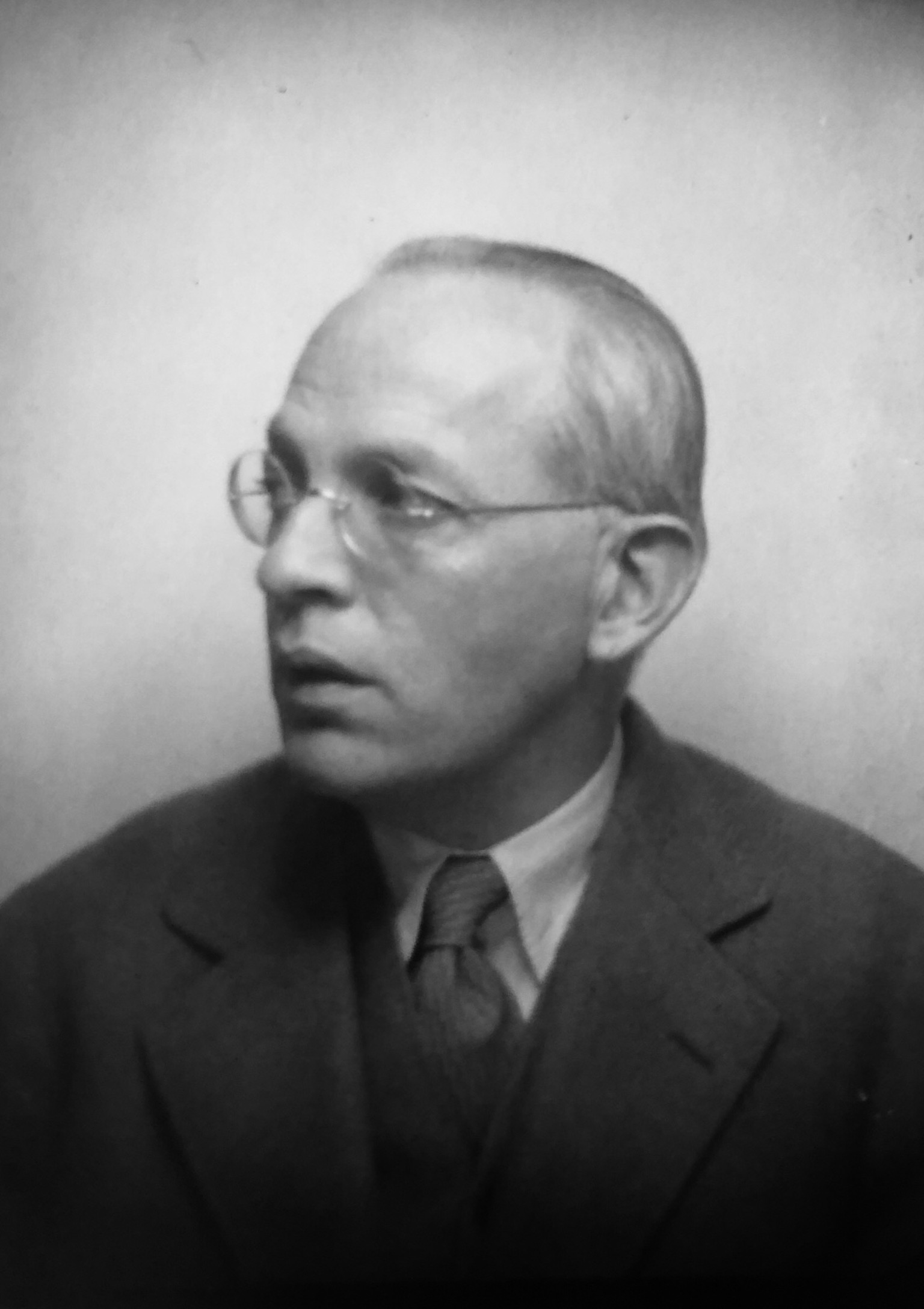
Leo Blumenreich c. 1920

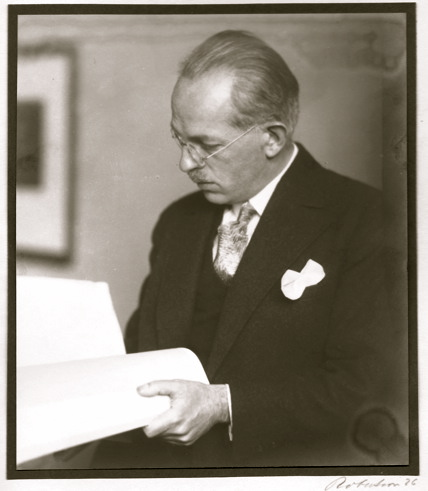
Leo Blumenreich, 1926. photo by Lili Baruch

Leo Blumenreich, real name Leonard Lewy (18 September 1884 – 12 May 1932) was a German art dealer, collector and patron.

== Life ==
Born in Berlin, Blumenreich was born the fourth son (of six children) of Paul Philipp Blumenreich (1849–1907) and his wife Adele (née Fränkel, 1850–1885). His father was a writer, journalist and bookseller, as well as co-founder and director of the Theater des Westens in Berlin, built in 1896. After the early death of his mother, his father married Gertrud Lewissohn in his second marriage and in his third marriage in 1891 the Austrian writer Franziska von Kapff-Essenther. Leo's eldest brother Arnold (1875–1943) was also a book and art dealer, first in Breslau, later in Berlin. Another older brother Walter (1880–?) ran a bookshop there.

After graduating from the Luisengymnasium Berlin in Berlin on 18 March 1898, the 15-year-old Leo went with his father, brother and sister to New York, where Paul Blumenreich was director of the German Theatre there for three years. In June 1902 Leo returned from America and moved to Vienna, where he trained for four years in the antiquarian book trade. He then went to a large antiquarian bookshop in Paris for a year's internship. In 1907 he began studying art history at the Friedrich Wilhelms University in Berlin and was a student of Heinrich Wölfflin and Max J. Friedländer, with whom he had a lifelong friendship. On Friedländer's 60th birthday in 1927, Blumenreich published an index of his writings. In 1909 Blumenreich's translation of the Rembrandt book by Jozef Israëls appeared.

In 1910, he moved to London, where he ran an antiquarian bookshop at 47 Duke's Street, St James's, with the Swiss Martin Hofer (1889–?) from 1911 to 1915, specialising in Dutch and Italian primitivism, as well as drawings and decorative arts. In London, he married Emmy Simon-Bermann (1871–1923) in October 1913.

In 1915, he moved to Berlin, where he was co-owner and director of the Paul Cassirer Gallery from 1916 to 1924. There he took over the department of old art and developed and organised exhibitions of artists such as Max Beckmann, Oskar Kokoschka, Ernst Barlach, Martin Bloch and Edvard Munch. Twice he travelled to Oslo with the art historian Curt Glaser and visited Munch's studio.

In 1923, Blumenreich acquired a plot of land in Berlin-Grunewald Wildpfad 28 and commissioned the architect Fritz Ruhemann to build a villa. On 24 April 1924, he married Hannah Cassirer, née Sotschek (1887–1974), the ex-wife of Alfred Cassirer and mother of his stepdaughter Eva Cassirer (1920–2009). In his house he decorated the walls with works from his collection of drawings, among others by masters such as Tiepolo, Rembrandt or Rubens. Leo Blumenreich donated many works of art to Berlin, which are now in the Kunstgewerbemuseum there, in the Bode-Museum, in the Kupferstichkabinett Berlin, Kunsthalle Bremen and Victoria and Albert Museum, London.

In 1924, Blumenreich went into business for himself and opened his gallery at Schöneberger Ufer 37, specialising in Dutch art and Old Master drawings and prints. In April 1928, he moved to Viktoriastraße (Berlin).

== Publications ==
- as translator: Jozef Israëls: Rembrandt. Harmonie, Verlagsgesellschaft für Literatur und Kunst, Berlin 1909.
- Verzeichnis der Schriften Max J. Friedländers. de Gruyter, Berlin 1927.
