= Wilfred Cass =

British art collector (1924–2022)

Wilfred Cass CBE FRSA
- Born: Wilfred Richard Cass; 11 November 1924; Berlin, Germany
- Died: 18 April 2022 (aged 97); Chichester, West Sussex, England
- Occupations: Businessman, philanthropist
- Known for: Co-founding the Cass Sculpture Foundation
- Spouse: Jeannette Cass
- Children: 1

Wilfred Richard Cass CBE FRSA (11 November 1924 – 18 April 2022) was a British businessman, art collector and philanthropist who co-founded the Cass Sculpture Foundation.

== Life and career ==
Cass was born in Berlin on 11 November 1924, and came from the Jewish Cassirer family. His great uncle, Paul Cassirer, was a significant dealer for the impressionists in Europe. His grandfather was Richard Cassirer, a noted German brain surgeon, and his other great uncles included a publisher, an industrialist and the philosopher, Ernst Cassirer.

After the war, Cass worked in 1946–1947 as junior research engineer for Telephone Rentals in Knightsbridge, London, before embarking on an HND in Communication Technology at the Regent Street Polytechnic in London between 1947 and 1951.

In 1979, Cass and his son, Mark, set up Image Bank UK, part of The Image Bank which was sold to Getty Images in 2001.

In 1987 Cass became chairman and chief executive of Moss Bros Plc, where he reorganised the whole of the troubled group including moving and selling its head office, starting up a new range of Suit Shops and buying Cecil Gee Plc. He remained at the company until 1991.

Upon retiring from Moss Bros in 1992, Cass moved from London to West Sussex, near Chichester, where he co-founded the registered charity, The Cass Sculpture Foundation, previously known as Sculpture at Goodwood. Over the next year they visited some thirty sculpture parks around the world before deciding upon the style, aim and design of their own estate. Long-term friends of Henry Moore and Elisabeth Frink, Cass and his wife Jeannette sold their personal collection of Moores, Frinks and Ayrtons, which they had bought directly from these artists, to fund the creation of their park.

Based in Goodwood, West Sussex, the charitable foundation's aim was to promote and advance British sculpture to a global audience through a vigorous programme of commissioning, funding and marketing, the Foundation has enabled the fabrication of 150 major new works by leading British artists. In 1996, the charity won the National Art Collections Fund prize for "Promoting Enjoyment of the Visual Arts".

He was created a Commander of the Order of the British Empire (CBE) on 17 June 2006. In April 2008 Cass was awarded an honorary degree from the Open University as Doctor of the University.

In later life the Casses lived on the grounds of the Cass Sculpture Foundation's sculpture park. He died at his home in Chichester, on 18 April 2022, at the age of 97.

== Portraits of Wilfred Cass ==
The National Portrait Gallery collection includes a portrait of Wilfred and Jeannette Cass by Anne-Katrin Purkiss. In 2008 Cass sat for a portrait sculpture in terracotta by Jon Edgar which is in the collection of the sitter and was exhibited at Yorkshire Sculpture Park in 2013 as part of the Sculpture Series Heads.

== See also ==
- Wilfred Cass's Full Biography at Sculpture.org.uk
- Cass Sculpture Foundation official site
- 'Small man, big art, even bigger park' article in The Guardian
- 'Wilfred Cass, co-Founder of the Cass Sculpture Foundation, is 90!', by Frances Follin, in Cassone: The International Online Magazine of Art and Art Books, November 2014
