= Rue Saint-Honoré in the Afternoon. Effect of Rain =

Painting by Camille Pissarro

- Rue Saint-Honoré, dans l'après-midi. Effet de pluie (French)
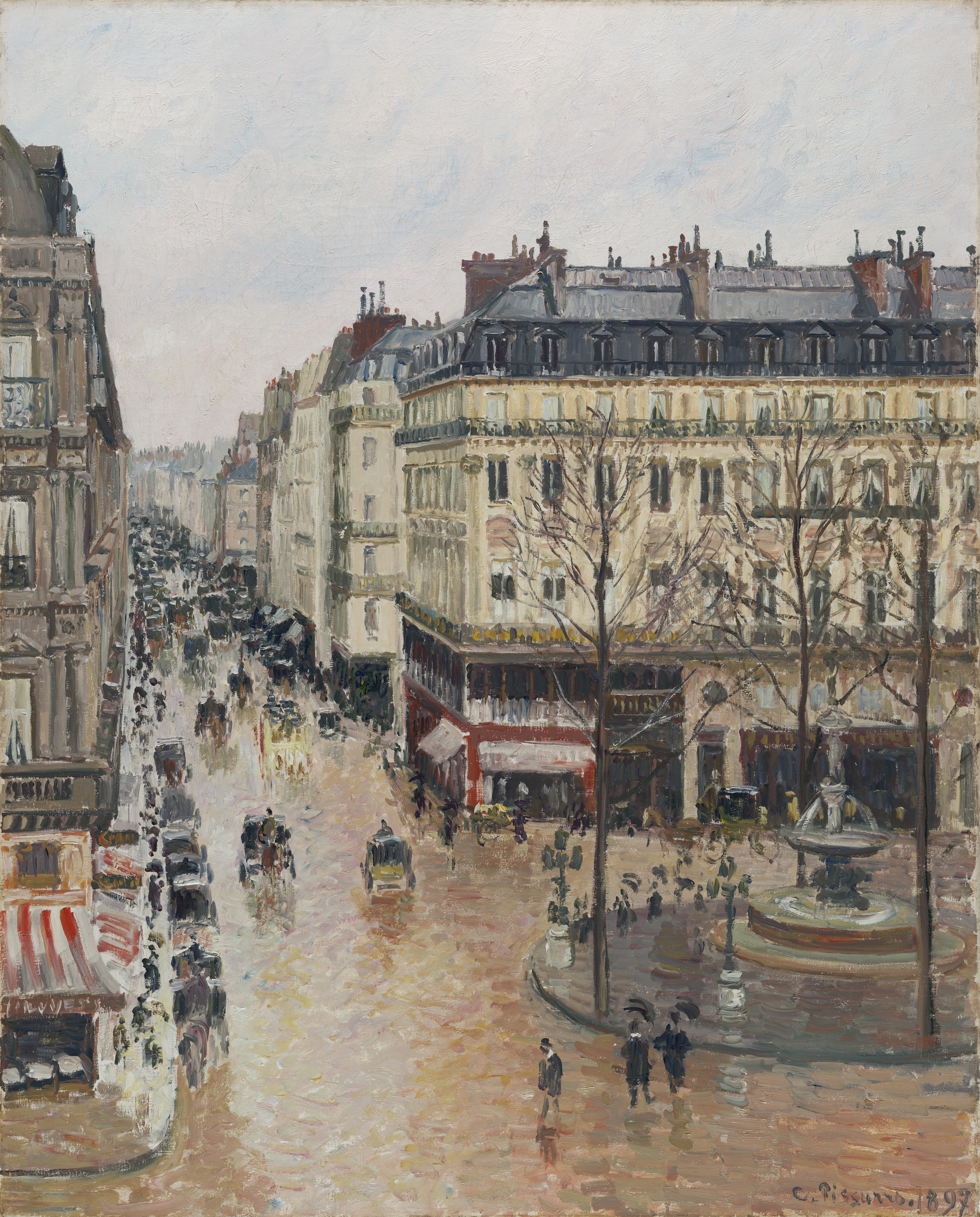
- Artist: Camille Pissarro
- Year: 1897
- Medium: Oil on canvas
- Dimensions: 81 cm × 65 cm (32 in × 26 in)
- Location: Museo Thyssen-Bornemisza, Madrid

Rue Saint-Honoré in the Afternoon. Effect of Rain (French: Rue Saint-Honoré, dans l'après-midi. Effet de pluie) is an 1897 oil painting by Camille Pissarro. The work was made towards the end of Pissarro's career, when he abandoned his experiments with Pointillism and returned to a looser Impressionist style. It is part of a series of works that Pissarro made in 1897–98 from a window of the Grand Hôtel du Louvre, looking down across the edge of the Place du Théâtre Français (now the Place André-Malraux) and along the rue Saint-Honoré, portraying the people, carriages and buildings, the trees, fountains and streetlamps, in an early afternoon shower of rain. Other paintings in the series depict a similar scene in morning sunlight, or in the shadows of the evening. The painting measures 81 cm × 65 cm (32 in × 26 in).

The painting has been displayed at the Museo Thyssen-Bornemisza in Madrid since the museum opened in 1992. It had been bought by Baron Hans Heinrich Thyssen-Bornemisza at the Hahn Gallery in New York in 1976, from an American collector who bought it at the Knoedler Gallery in New York in 1952. In 1993, the Baron sold it with the rest of his collection of 775 works to the Spanish state for US$350 million. A claim that the painting was Nazi looted art was dismissed by US federal courts in 2019 and 2020, on the grounds that the law of Spain applied. However, in September 2021, the United States Supreme Court accepted certiorari to review that decision, and on 21 April 2022, the Court ruled that the lower courts had incorrectly applied federal common law to apply Spanish law when they should have applied the law of California, and remanded the case for further proceedings. On January 9, 2024, the federal intermediate appellate court ruled in favor of the Museo Thyssen-Bornemisza by holding that California would apply its law on conflict of laws in such a way as to defer to the law of Spain.

== Provenance ==
The painting was bought from Pissarro by the German businessman Julius Cassirer in 1897, and it was inherited by his son Fritz Cassirer and then by Fritz's wife Lilly. She remarried, but in 1939, as a German Jew, she was forced to sell the painting to Jakob Scheidwimmer, an official of the Reichskammer der bildenden Künste, for the low price of 900 ℛ︁ℳ︁ to secure an exit visa, shortly before the outbreak of the Second World War. The painting was sold at an auction in Berlin in 1943 for 95,000 ℛ︁ℳ︁ and disappeared from public view. In 1958, a German court awarded Lilly Cassirer Neubauer compensation of DM 120,000, the fair market value for the work.

In 2005, Lilly's grandson Claude Cassirer and other heirs filed a claim to recover the painting. In January 2011 the Spanish government denied a request by the US ambassador to return the painting, and in 2015 a Spanish court ruled that the painting belonged to the museum. In April 2019 the United States District Court for the Central District of California ruled that the painting belongs to Fundación Colección Thyssen-Bornemisza, on the basis that the baron and then the museum did not know it was looted art when they bought it. While that decision was affirmed by the United States Court of Appeals for the Ninth Circuit in 2020, in September 2021, the U.S. Supreme Court accepted certiorari to review the Ninth Circuit's decision. The case was heard on January 18, 2022 and on April 21, 2022, the Supreme Court, disagreeing with the decision of the Ninth Circuit's decision, vacated the judgement.

Writing for a unanimous court, Justice Elena Kagan ruled that the lower courts had erred in applying federal common law to resolve the threshold choice of law question of whether the law of Spain or the law of California would control. The high court held that when hearing non-federal claims under the Foreign Sovereign Immunities Act, a federal court must apply state law to choice-of-law questions, which in this case meant the law of California. Therefore, the case was remanded to allow the lower courts to apply the law of California governing conflict of laws, to determine whether a California state court would apply its own substantive property law to the ownership of the painting or would defer to the law of Spain.

Following the Supreme Court's decision, the case was remanded to the Ninth Circuit, which tried to certify the choice-of-law question under California law to the Supreme Court of California. In August 2023, the state supreme court declined to hear that question and sent it back to the Ninth Circuit, meaning that the federal court was required to make an Erie guess as to how a California state court would resolve the question. On January 9, 2024, the Ninth Circuit ruled in favor of the foundation — holding that under the law of California (specifically, a 2010 landmark opinion of the Supreme Court of California involving Terrence McCann), ownership of the painting had to be decided under the law of Spain, rather than the law of California. This holding did not require any further proceedings below to determine what was the actual law of Spain. During the original proceedings in the district court back in 2015, the court had already analyzed that law (after first applying federal common law to defer to Spanish law) and ruled in favor of the museum on the merits by granting the museum's motion for summary judgment in its favor under Spanish law. The critical difference between the two legal systems is that the Civil Code of Spain allows for acquisitive prescription of personal property against the true owner, while California does not recognize adverse possession of personal property.

The Ninth Circuit's decision was highly controversial in California. As a result, on September 16, 2024, Governor Gavin Newsom signed a bill which expressly overrides California's governmental interest test for resolving a conflict of laws in the specific context of "art or personal property taken in cases of political persecution" and instead prescribes that California substantive law will always control. The bill was enacted as an urgency statute with immediate effect. This new rule was to apply not only to all new cases going forward, but also to all cases still pending on appeal (including the Cassirer case).

On March 10, 2025, the U.S. Supreme Court filed an order vacating the Ninth Circuit's 2024 judgment and remanding the case for further proceedings in light of the new California statute. Counsel for the Cassirer heirs released a statement expressing gratitude to the high court, while counsel for the museum indicated they would attempt to challenge the retroactive extraterritorial application of the new statute as unconstitutional.

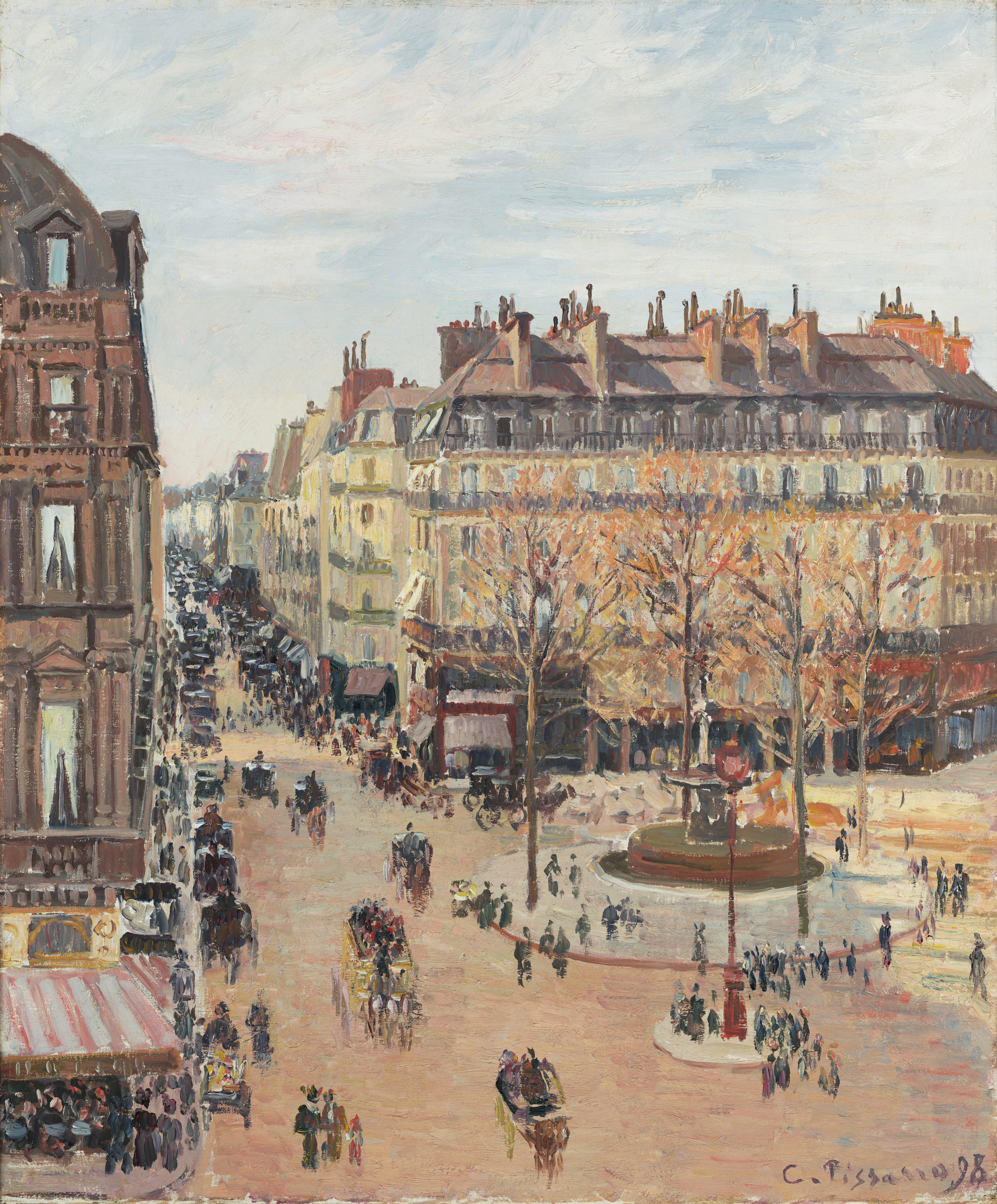
Same scene in sun: Rue Saint-Honoré, Sun Effect, Afternoon, 1898, Nelson-Atkins Museum of Art

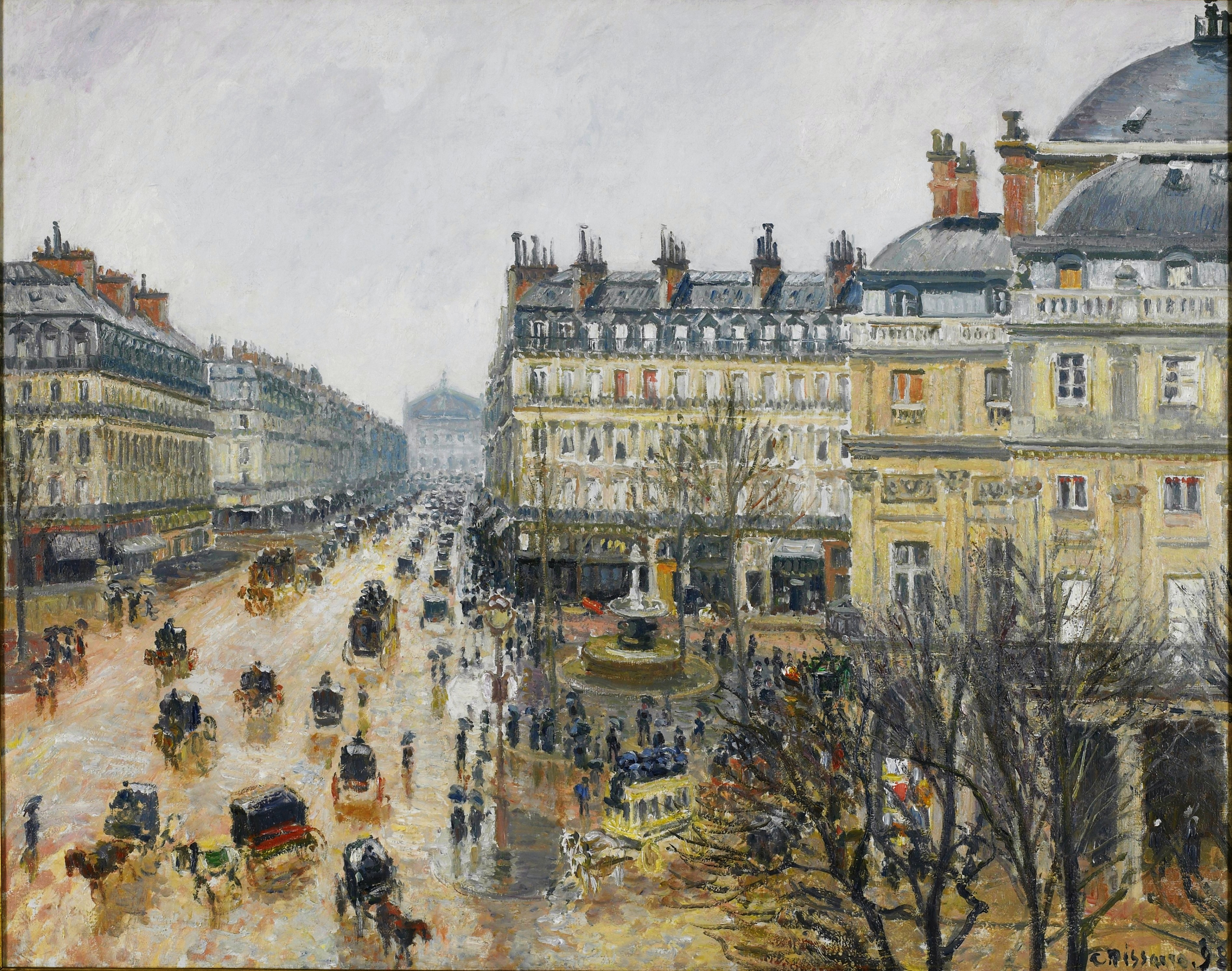
Adjacent view: Place du Théâtre Français, Paris: Rain, 1898, Minneapolis Institute of Art

== See also ==
- La Place du Théâtre Français
- List of paintings by Camille Pissarro
