= La Place du Théâtre Français =

1898 painting by Camille Pissarro

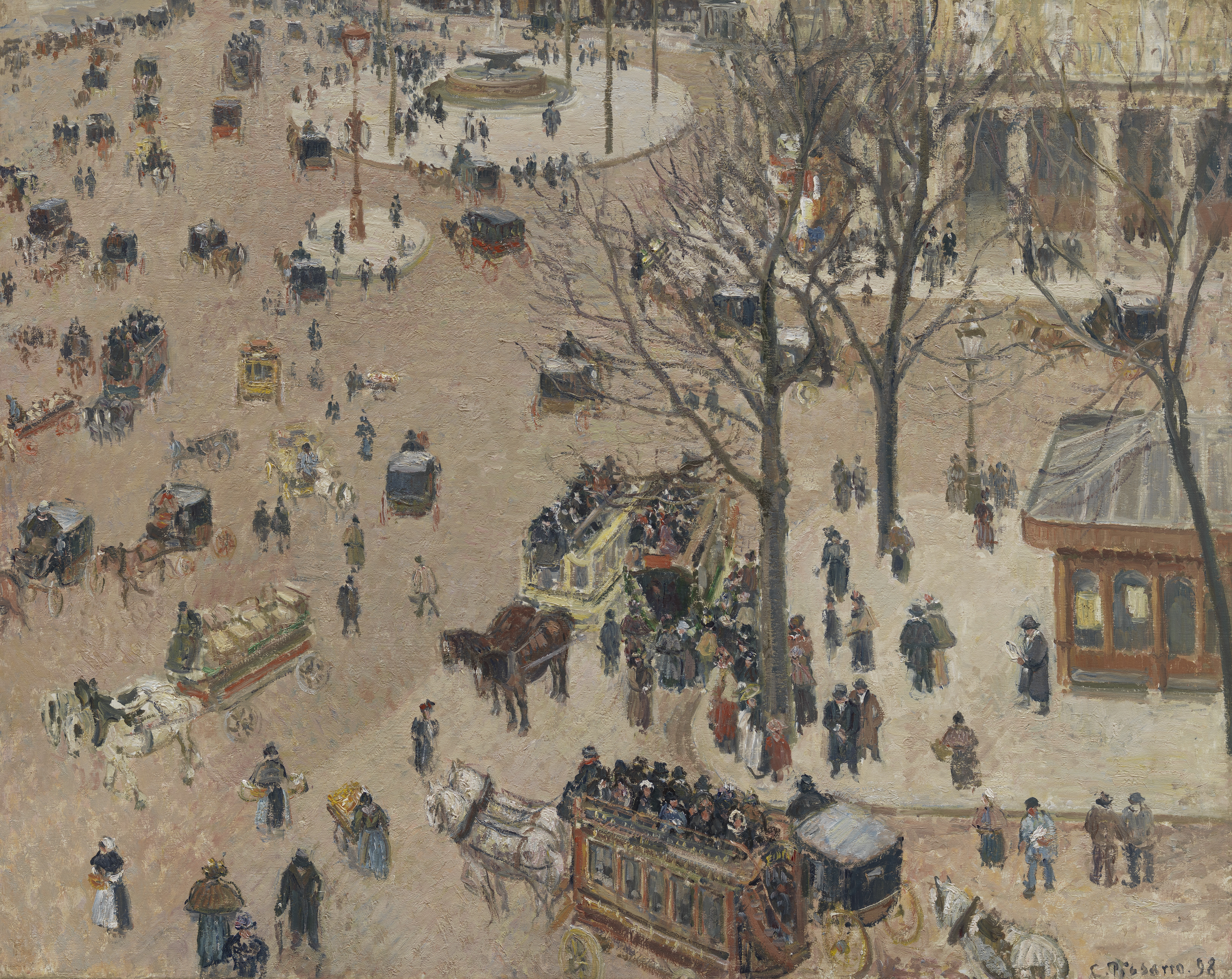
- Artist: Camille Pissarro
- Year: 1898
- Medium: Oil on canvas
- Dimensions: 92.71 cm × 72.39 cm (36.5 in × 28.5 in)
- Location: Los Angeles County Museum of Art, Los Angeles

La Place du Théâtre Français is an 1898 oil painting by Danish-French Impressionist and Neo-Impressionist painter Camille Pissarro in the collection of the Los Angeles County Museum of Art in Los Angeles, California. It is one of the approximately 15 paintings that Pissarro made while staying at the Grand Hôtel du Louvre in Paris.

== Background ==
On December 15, 1897, Pissarro informed his son Lucien that he was going to stay at the Grand Hôtel du Louvre in Paris, as he thought the view of nearby avenue de l'Opéra and the corner of the Place du Palais-Royal would make a good subject for his paintings. He described these streets of Paris as silvery, luminous and alive – and that they would make a great motif for him.

Pissarro rented a room that gave him a suitable view of avenue de l'Opéra and began to work. He stayed in the hotel until April and created approximately 15 painting showing the rue Saint-Honoré, the avenue de l'Opéra, and the Place du Théâtre Français from different perspectives and in different weather conditions. Most of his work from that time was later shown at the "Exposition d'œuvres récentes de Camille Pissarro" organised by Paul Durand-Ruel in June 1898.

== Description ==
The painting captures a larger image of everyday life of Parisians from above from a few-story building. The wide open space of the Place du Théâtre Français is in the foreground, shown here where it becomes the avenue de l'Opéra (its beginnings are almost invisible). The composition is closed off on the right by the theater facade. At the end we can see Charles Garnier’s opera house. People depicted are Parisians from different social classes living their everyday lives. In some parts of the painting we can see cropped people, horses and carriages that give a sense of reality and movement and a feeling like this painting was based on a photograph of a busy Parisian street. The image appears flattened, as there are no shadows at all and the sunlight is the same in all parts of the painting. People in the painting wear bright clothes only in the foreground; the further we look, the more subdued the colors of clothes are and people are less visible with less detail – just like in a photograph the closer elements are more clear and visible. Several scholars like John Rewald, Leopold Reidemeister and Charles Kunstler compared the paintings Pissarro made in the Hôtel du Louvre to contemporary photographs. The absence of the sky and horizon and the perspective of a rising background suggest parallels with the composition of Japanese prints.

== See also ==
- Rue Saint-Honoré in the Afternoon. Effect of Rain
- List of paintings by Camille Pissarro
