= Eva Cassirer =

German philosopher, astronomer and art collector

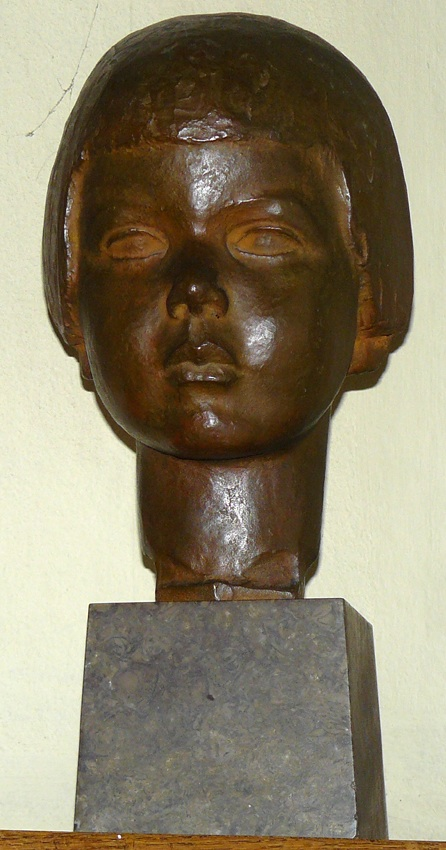
- Georg Kolbe, Bust of Eva Cassirer, 1923, Bronze.
- Born: 28 January 1920; Berlin, Germany
- Died: 19 September 2009 (aged 89); Calvià, Majorca, Spain
- Education: University of London (PhD)
- Father: Alfred Cassirer
- Honours: Righteous Among the Nations

Eva Cassirer (Berlin, 28 January 1920 – Calvià, Majorca, Spain, 19 September 2009) was a German philosopher, astronomer and art collector. She was an honorary professor at Technische Universität Berlin. She was awarded the honorary title Righteous Among the Nations in 2011.

== Early life ==
Born in Berlin, Cassirer was the daughter of the Jewish industrialist Alfred Cassirer and his wife Elisabeth Johanna (Hannah) Sotscheck (1887-1974); she was also the niece of Ernst Cassirer and Tilla Durieux. Her parents divorced a few years after Eva's birth and her mother married her second husband, Leo Blumenreich, in 1924. Eva, grew up with her mother and stepfather in a shared household in a villa in Berlin-Grunewald Wildpfad 28. Eva kept her birth name. As early as 1922/23, the sculptor Georg Kolbe created a bronze head of Eva Cassirer on behalf of her father. Her biological father died in 1932 and left, among other things, an art collection of oriental decorative arts and Islamic carpets, which he had loaned to the Museum of Islamic Art in Berlin; this loan was later converted into a donation by Eva Cassirer.

Eva's parents

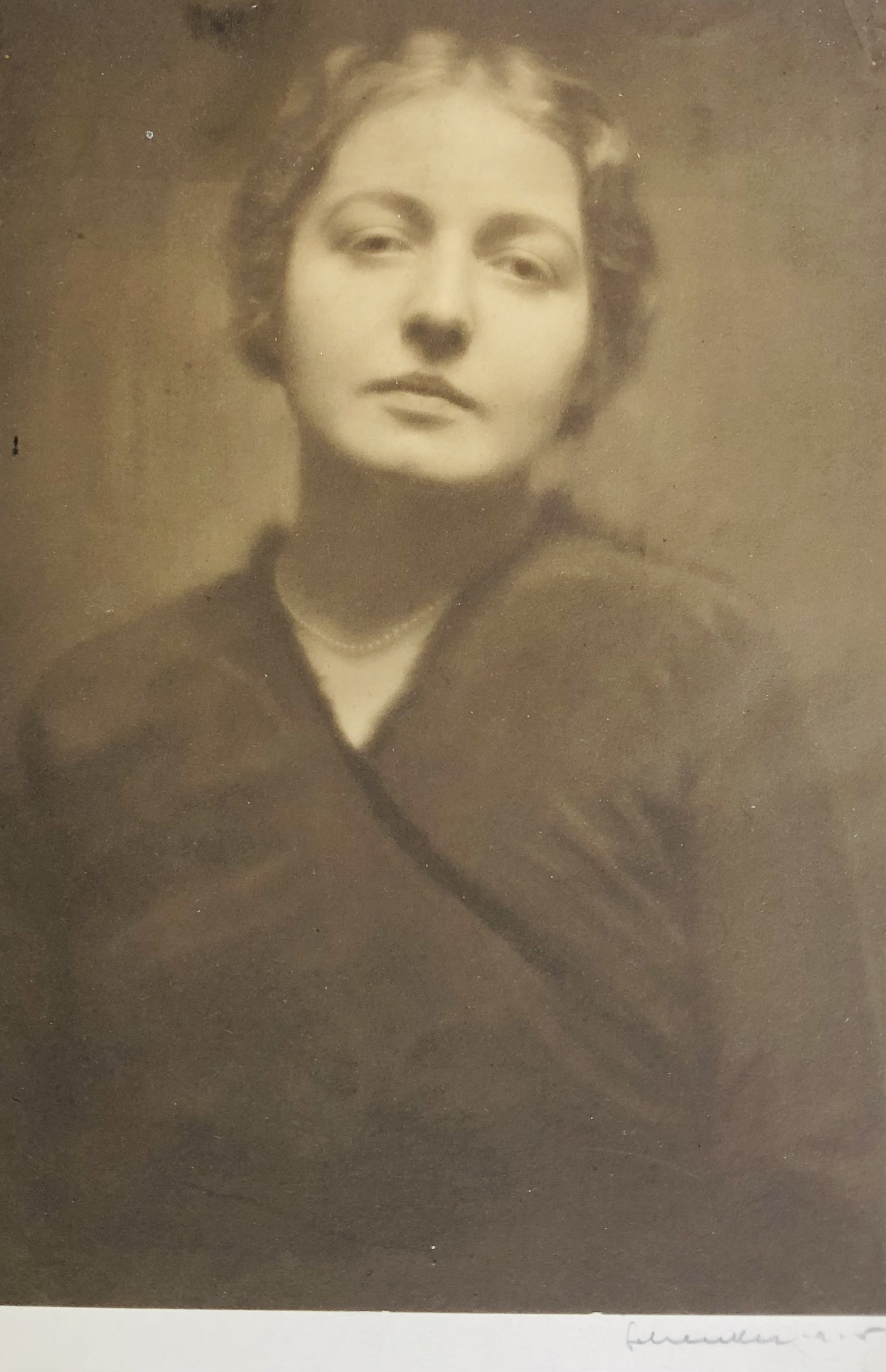
Hannah Sotschek, Eva's mother

Alfred Cassirer, Eva's father, with a young Eva

== World War II ==
Eva was brought up as a Christian by her mother. Despite her Jewish father, she was not forcibly marked as Jewish during the National Socialist era. Eva and her mother hid several "illegal" persons in the basement of their villa to evade registration by the police authorities. In addition, Eva's former classmate Elisabeth "Lilo" Jacoby was taken into the household after Eva found her on the street. Elisabeth's parents, the journalist of the Berliner Tageblatts Bruno Jacoby (b. 1879) and his wife Ella Jacoby née Davidsohn (1889-1942) had been deported to Riga on 5 September 1942. Elisabeth Jacoby and her brother Hans, as forced labourers of the Berlin Siemens & Halske factory, were not deported together with their parents. However, after the brother and sister were also supposed to report for deportation in January 1943 in Große Hamburger Straße, the main street of the Jewish quarter, they initially hid with their former nanny. After the building was destroyed by a bomb, they lived on the street and hid in ruins. During this time, Elisabeth lost sight of her brother at some point. In the Blumenreich house, Elisabeth Jacoby was passed off as a maid to guests. False identity papers in the name of "Liselotte Lehmann" had been obtained for her by Eva Cassirer. Part of the villa was rented out to Prince Friedrich Christian of Schaumburg-Lippe, an employee in the Reich Ministry for Popular Enlightenment and Propaganda, who pretended not to notice the illegally housed persons. Elisabeth Jacoby survived the Holocaust through the help.

== Academic career ==
Cassirer studied philosophy and astronomy in the United States and England, and received her doctorate from the University of London in 1957 with The Concept of Time: An Investigation into the Time of Psychology with Special Reference to Memory and a Comparison with the Time of Physics. The philosophy of time remained her main topic thereafter.

From 1965 to 1975, she taught the subject philosophy of science at the University of St Andrews as Senior Lecturer. She was later Honorary Professorin Philosophy at Technische Universität Berlin. In addition, she was a Fellow of the Royal Astronomical Society. In 1975, she translated John Langshaw Austin's book Sense and Sensibilia from the English. In 1999, she translated George Pitcher's book The Dog Who Came from the Wild. The Adventure of a Friendship from the American.

Because of their help for those illegally harboured in the Third Reich, Eva Cassirer and her mother were posthumously recognised as Righteous Among the Nations by Yad Vashem on 11 January 2011.
