= Jeanne Forain =

French painter and sculptor

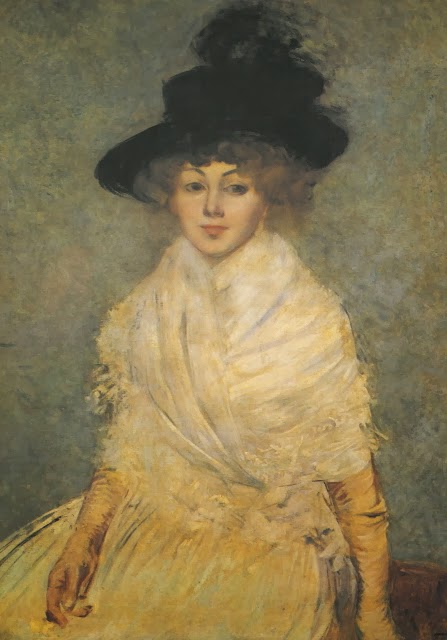
- Jeanne Forain in 1891, by her husband
- Born: Jeanne Bosc; 25 January 1865; Paris, France
- Died: 1954 (aged 88–89); Le Chesnay, France
- Known for: portraits in pastel and oil, marionettes
- Movement: Post-Impressionism
- Spouse: Jean-Louis Forain

Jeanne Forain (née Bosc; 25 January 1865 – 1954) was a French painter and sculptor. She was the wife of the painter and caricaturist Jean-Louis Forain.

== Family and personal life ==
She was born in the Marais district of Paris on 25 January 1865. Her father, Michel Bosc, taught French, Latin and Greek at the Collège Rollin. During the Franco-Prussian War of 1870 her family moved to Auvers-sur-Oise, where they remained for several years. There the young Jeanne Bosc met Camille Pissarro, who encouraged her parents to allow her to study art. On the family's return to Paris, the 18-year old Jeanne Bosc studied with various teachers including Louise Abbéma.

She married Jean-Louis Forain in 1891. She and her husband travelled extensively in Europe and elsewhere, visiting the United States in 1893 and Constantinople, the Holy Land and Egypt in 1913. Their only child, a son named Jean-Loup, was born in 1895.

== Work ==
Jeanne Forain specialized in portraits, particularly favouring children as subjects. Her style was influenced by Velázquez, Quentin de la Tour and Hogarth. She exhibited a pastel portrait entitled Tête de jeune-fille at the Salon de la Société des artistes français in 1889, and participated in the Salon du Champs de Mars beginning in 1890. Her subjects were generally members of her family and the literary and artistic circles to which she and her husband belonged. In 1904 Henri de Régnier wrote to André Gide that Jeanne Forain was painting a portrait of Pierre Louÿs. The critic Armand Dayot wrote in 1921 that she "excelled at expressing... the first movements of thought, the first shivers of the soul".

In 1904 Jeanne Forain encountered a troupe of puppeteers whose wagon had fallen into a ditch on the road near Deauville. She took them to her house on the rue Spontini in Paris, where she organized a benefit performance for them. This experience led her to create her own marionette theatre, which she called the Théâtre des Nabots. She sculpted most of the puppets' heads and bodies, while her society friends sewed costumes for the approximately 80 figures, representing dancers, princesses, jugglers and other characters. The head of one marionette, representing a young dancer, has been attributed to Edgar Degas, who was a close friend of Jeanne Forain and her husband. The proceeds from the puppet shows went to purchase clothing for poor Parisian children. Many of the puppets were later acquired by the French puppetteer Jacques Chesnais and were sold at auction in 2014.

Jeanne Forain died in 1954 in Le Chesnay, France. The Musée Carnavalet, the Centre national des arts plastiques, and the Musée du Petit Palais own works by her. The first comprehensive solo exhibition of works by Jeanne Forain was held in the summer of 2016 at the Musée Alfred-Canel in Pont-Audemer, France.
