= Goodwood Art Foundation =

English non profit art gallery

- Location within West Sussex

General information
- Type: Art Gallery
- Location: Goodwood Estate, West Sussex
- Coordinates: 50.8788565°N 0.7215716°W
- Opened: 2025
- Owner: Duke of Richmond

Website
- www.goodwoodartfoundation.org

Goodwood Art Foundation is a contemporary art gallery located on the Goodwood Estate in West Sussex, England. The non-profit foundation, set up by the Duke of Richmond in 2025, features both indoors and outdoors exhibition space.

== Site and facilities ==
The foundation is on the same site as the Cass Sculpture Foundation, which had previously closed down in 2020. The Duke of Richmond launched the non-profit art foundation in May 2025, with an expanded outdoor area covering 70 acres that includes wildflower meadow, cherry grove, and newly planted woodland. Landscaping was designed by Dan Pearson. Two indoor galleries, previously part of the Cass, were refurbished, and a new building constructed for the onsite café.

== Art and artists ==
The aim of the venue is to show the "best contemporary art in the world, in all media". Artists that have had works displayed at the foundation include Isamu Noguchi, Veronica Ryan, Hélio Oiticica, and Rose Wylie. The first exhibition hosted by the foundation was a 2025 installation by sculptor Rachel Whiteread.
