= Löwe (sculpture) =

Sculpture in Berlin, Germany

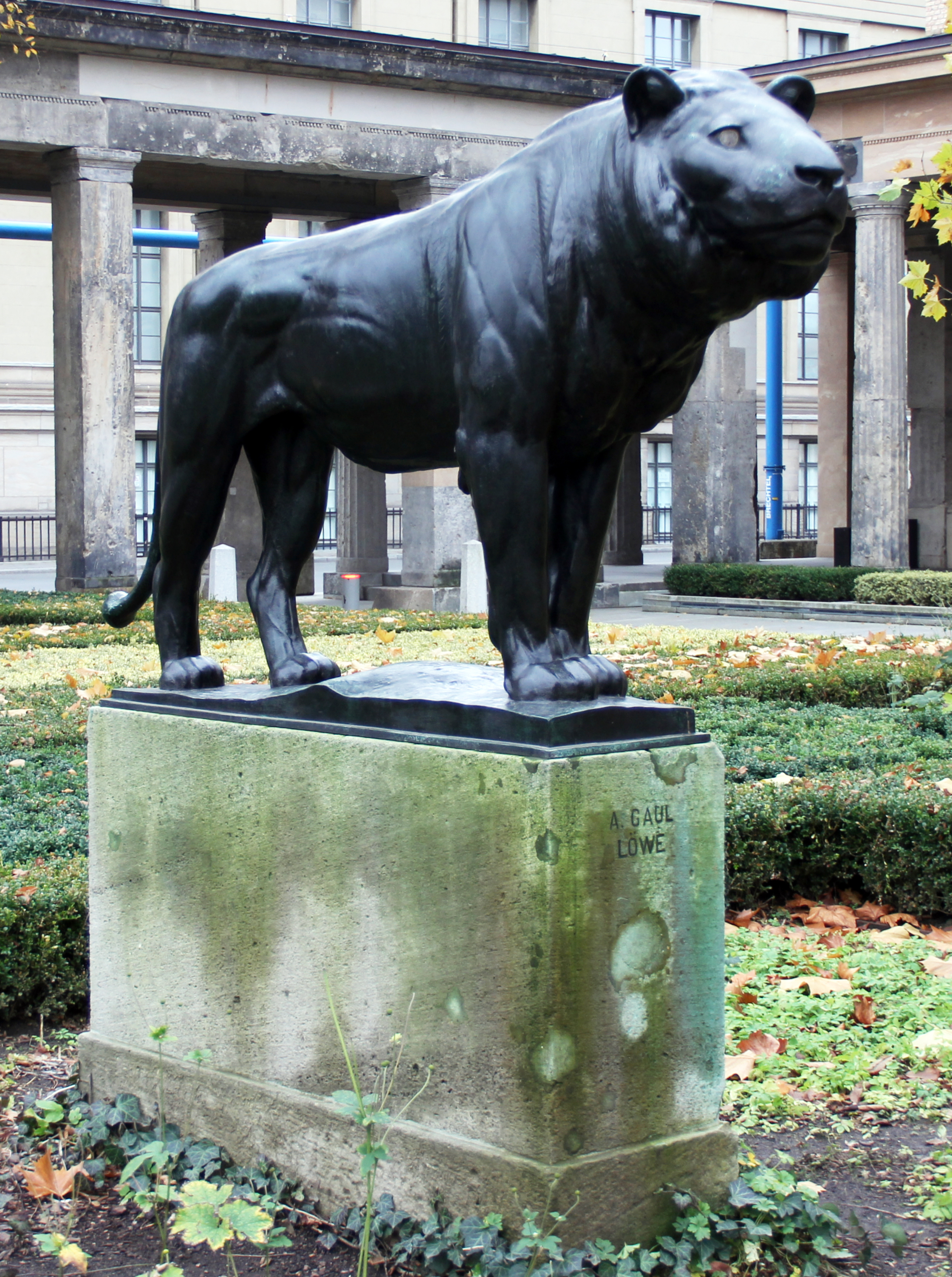
- The sculpture in 2013
- Location: Berlin, Germany

Löwe is a sculpture by August Gaul, installed in the Kolonnadenhof outside the Alte Nationalgalerie in Berlin, Germany.
