= Cass Sculpture Foundation =

English charitable commissioning body

Coordinates: 50°52′44.38″N 0°43′7.95″W

The Cass Sculpture Foundation was a charitable commissioning body based in Goodwood, Sussex, England. The Foundation's 26-acre grounds were home to an ever-changing display of 80 monumental sculptures, all of which were available for sale with the proceeds going directly to artists. The Foundation was a self-sufficient body reliant on sales of commissioned sculptures and visitor entrance fees.

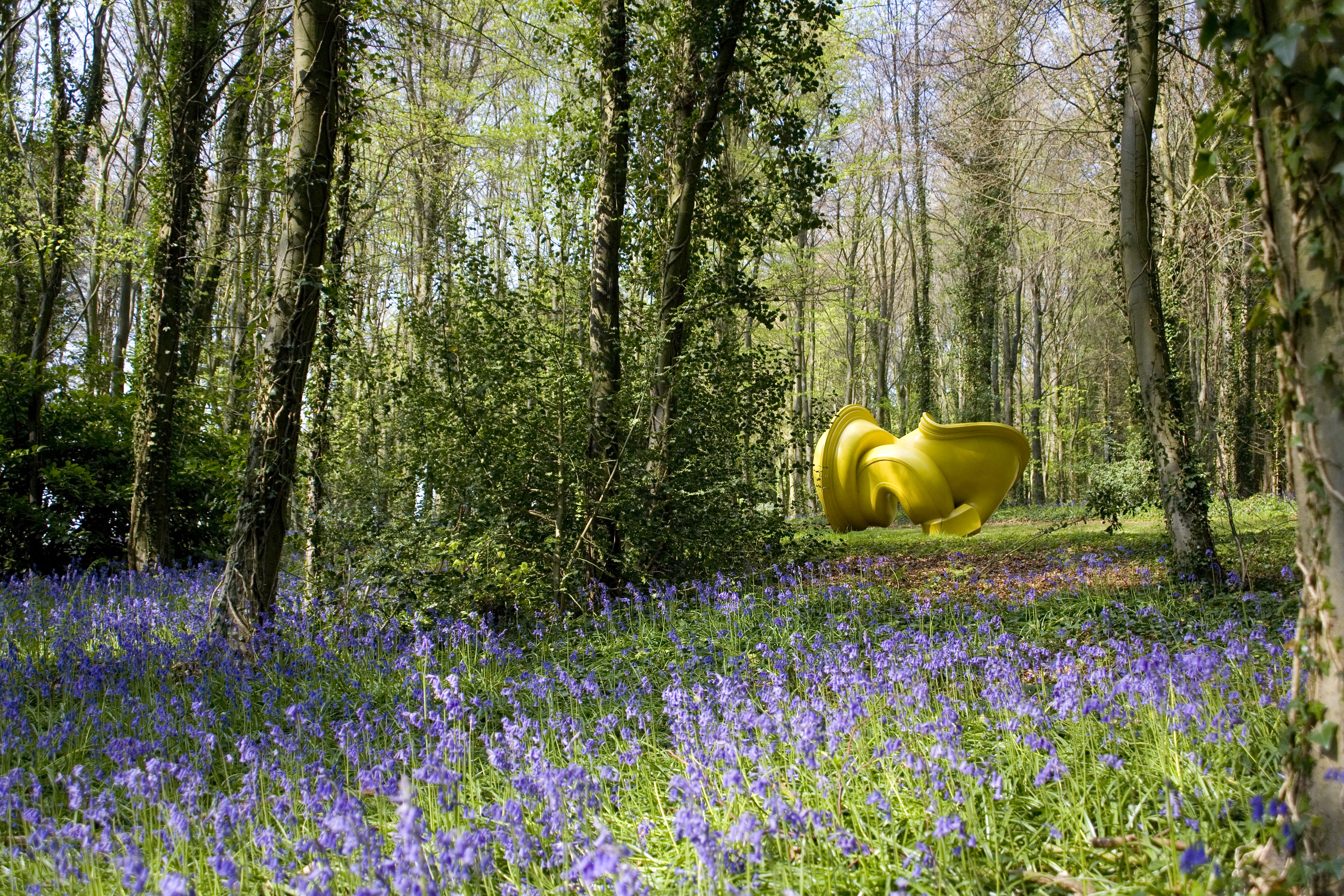
Declination (2005) by Tony Cragg in the grounds of Cass Sculpture Foundation in 2019.

After a review in 2020, the Foundation's Trustees decided to wind up the foundation and the park was closed. The Foundation's archive of drawings and maquettes was acquired by the Pallant House Gallery in Chichester.

== Foundation and artists ==
Inspired by their own extensive collection of works from artists such as Elisabeth Frink and Henry Moore, the founders Wilfred and Jeannette Cass embarked on a journey to design a foundation for the world of model sculpture. After research and visits to other sculpture parks such as the Kröller-Müller Museum in the Netherlands, the Louisiana Museum of Modern Art in Denmark, and the Hakone Open-Air Museum in Japan, the Cass Sculpture Foundation was fully established in 1992.

The Foundation commissioned over 400 works from both emerging and established artists. Previous commissions included work by Anthony Caro, Tony Cragg, Andy Goldsworthy, Marc Quinn, Kiki Smith, and Rachel Whiteread. The foundation’s ambition was to financially support artists so they could perfect their art, try out new mediums, and create the avant-garde. The founders hoped that the commissions would act as a catalyst for sculptors, propelling them to other area of the art world, to collaborate with other artists, and to travel.

The Foundation marked its twentieth anniversary in 2012 with the London exhibit of 'Tony Cragg at Exhibition Road'. This exhibit displayed 12 works from renowned British artist Tony Cragg along Exhibition Road and its accompanying cultural institutions including the V&A, Science and Natural History Museums. This anniversary also saw the Foundation launch a number of new international partnerships. These included working with the Hermitage Museum in Russia, The Creative India Foundation in Hyderabad, India and the Yellow River Arts Centre in Yinchuan, China.

== Trustees ==
- Wilfred Cass – Founder
- Jeannette Cass – Founder
- Mark Cass – Chairman
- Derek Pullen
- Dr Wenny Teo
- Sir Michael Peat (private secretary to the then Charles, Prince of Wales)
- Earl of March & Kinrara
- David Solomon

== Commissioning ==
Cass was an authority on the commissioning and exhibiting of large-scale sculpture. The organization's charitable objectives were met through the sale of its sculptures. Once a work was sold, Cass split the profit between the artist and the next commission, thereby ensuring that it maintained a rolling collection of new works.

The commissioning process could take between 1 and 5 years from conception to completion. During the process, the artist contributed a maquette and works on paper to the Foundation's archive for educational purposes

Through meeting fabrication costs and other additional costs (including installation and marketing), the Foundation funded artists to work on a very large scale making works several meters high. The Foundation encouraged pioneering and experimental works that challenged the creative processes of each artist to further their careers.

== Artists ==
Sculptors displaying works at the Cass Sculpture Foundation have included: Kenneth Armitage, Anthony Caro, Lynn Chadwick, Tony Cragg, Paul Day, Richard Deacon, Elisabeth Frink, Andy Goldsworthy, Antony Gormley, Thomas Heatherwick, Shirazeh Houshiary, Allen Jones, Phillip King, Bryan Kneale, Eduardo Paolozzi, Marc Quinn, Kiki Smith, Gavin Turk, Rachel Whiteread, Bill Woodrow, Manfred Kielnhofer, Jesse Wine, and David Worthington.

== See also ==
- Goodwood Art Foundation
- List of Sculpture Parks
