= Fritz Ruhemann =

German architect

- Born: Friedrich Abraham Ruhemann; 8 May 1891; Berlin, Germany
- Died: November 1982 (aged 91)
- Occupation: Architect

Friedrich Abraham "Fritz" Ruhemann (8 May 1891 – November 1982) was a German architect.

Ruhemann was born on 8 May 1891 in Berlin, Germany.

Ruhemann, who was Jewish, fled the Nazis and worked in England, including Bedford Park, London. His brother was the picture restorer Helmut Ruhemann. Clients often included other emigres, and he designed a bungalow for fellow emigrant Leo Neumann, built in 1937–38.
