= Julius Cassirer =

German Jewish art collector (1841–1924)

Julius Cassirer (February 2, 1841, in Schwientochlowitz – June 18, 1924, in Berlin) was a German Jewish industrialist and art collector and principal shareholder of Kabelwerke Dr. Cassirer & Co. in Berlin. An artwork from his collection is the object of one of the longest-running Holocaust-linked art restitution cases in history.

== Family ==
Julius Cassirer was the second oldest son of ten children of Marcus Cassirer (1809–1879) and his wife Jeannette, née Steinitz (1813–1889). He was born in 1841 in Schwientochlowitz, today Świętochłowice. He married Julie (Julcher) Cassirer (1844–1924), the daughter of his uncle Siegfried Cassirer (1812–1897), and had three children with her: the writer and musician Fritz Leopold Cassirer, the publisher Bruno Cassirer, and Elise Cassirer.

== Professional life ==
From 1866, Julius, together with his brother Louis, was authorized signatory of the Marcus Cassirer & Co. Liqueur Factory in Breslau. His father retired as a partner of the liqueur factory now managed by his sons, he died on October 20, 1879, in Breslau and left his property equally to his nine children still living.

Julius went to Görlitz, where he ran the Cassirer and Sons company together with his brother Isidor Cassirer until the 1870s. In the early 1880s, Louis and Julius Cassirer moved to Berlin, becoming lumber merchants and suppliers with the Gebr. Cassirer Bau- und Naturholzhandlung. Gradually, the brothers Eduard, Salo and Isidor, and Max also came to Berlin and settled in Charlottenburg, which was still independent at the time. Together with his nephews Alfred and Hugo, who had worked in the cable factory of his uncle Otto Bondy in Vienna after receiving his doctorate in chemistry, Julius Cassirer founded the cable factory Dr. Cassirer und Co. in the backyard of Schönhauser Allee 62 in 1896, in which Louis Cassirer later also became a partner.

The cable works moved its production to Hakenfelde at Keplerstraße 5-6 and by 1912, the Cassirers employed 150 workers and salaried employees there. By 1914, the workforce had grown to 630 people and the working capital amounted to 5 million marks with annual sales of 10 million marks. Julius Cassirer was also a partner in the sales office of Vereinigter Fabriken isolierter Leitungsdrähte Berlin GmbH, the Linear Gummiwarenfabrik and the Oberschlesische Telefongesellschaft, he lived in a villa at Fasanenstrasse 12 in Charlottenburg and was regarded as a "well-appointed, respected man."

== Positions ==
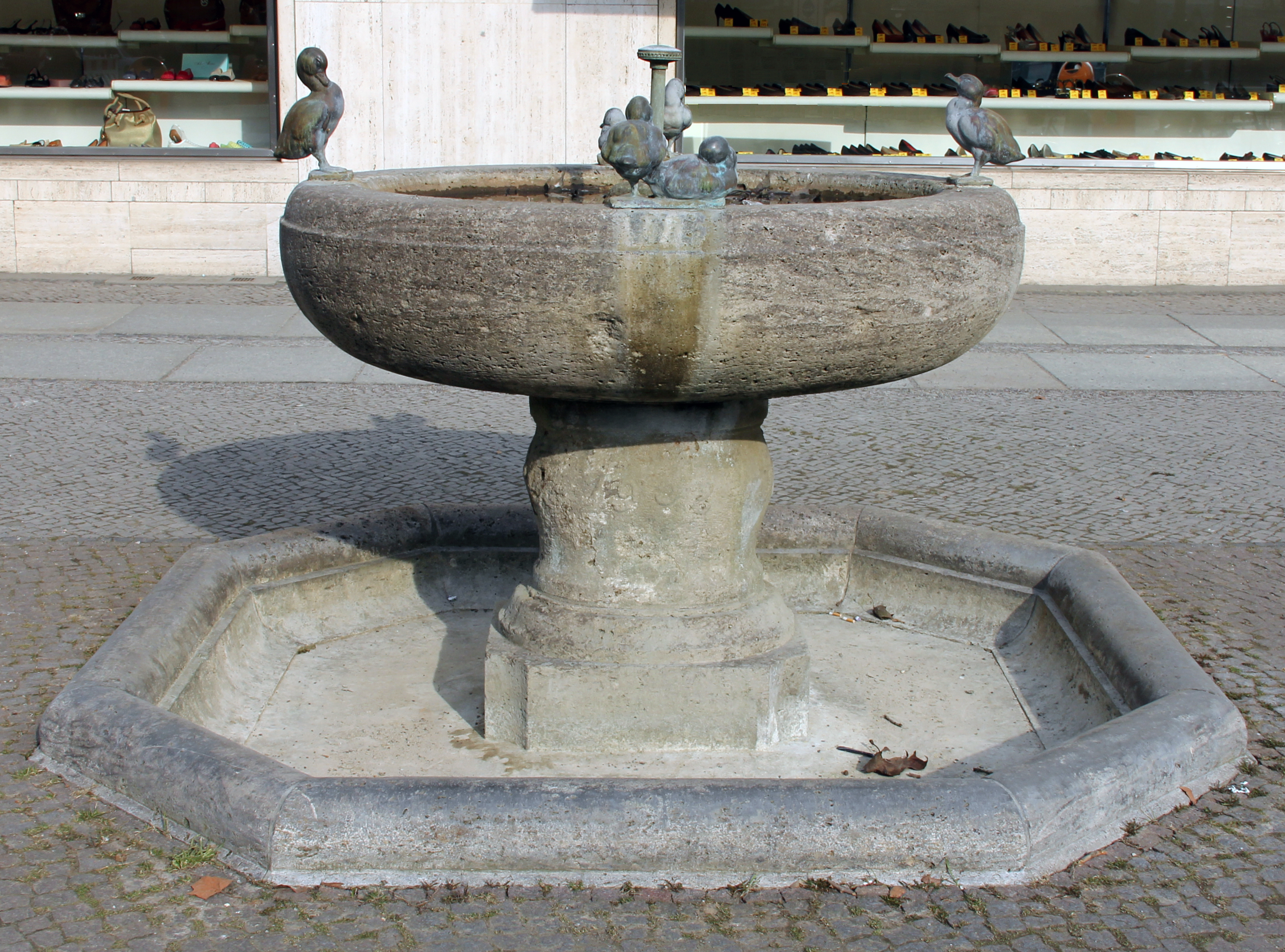
Schwanenkükenbrunnen von August Gaul, 1908

Cassirer belonged to the Berlin Chamber of Commerce, the Commission for Customs, Tax and Trade Issues, the Commissions for Legal and Traffic Issues, the Stock Exchange Board and, from 1904 to 1908, he served as a commercial judge. In 1910, he donated to the city of Charlottenburg the Swan Chick Fountain made by August Gaul in 1908, which is located at Kurfürstendamm 61. In 1914 he was appointed a Royal Commercial Councillor.

== Art collector ==
Artworks that Cassirer owned included Rue Saint-Honoré, dans l'après-midi. Effet de pluie, a 1897 oil painting by Camille Pissarro. When Cassirer died in 1924, the painting was inherited by his son Fritz Cassirer and then by Fritz's wife Lilly. When the Nazis came to power, Cassirer's daughter-in-law Lilly was persecuted by the Nazis because she was Jewish, and forced to relinquish the painting. Lilly Cassirer demanded from Germany a restitution of the painting in the 1950s, when she was an American resident. Her request was heard and in 1958 she received a compensation of DM 120,000, the market value at that time of the work. In 2005, Cassirer's great-grandson Claude Cassirer and other heirs filed a restitution claim against Thyssen-Bornemisza Collection Foundation in Spain. The lawsuit Cassirer v Thyssen-Bornemisza Collection Foundation is still ongoing, and most recently the object of a decision by the Supreme Court of the United States of America.

== Literature ==
- Sigrid Bauschinger: Die Cassirers. Unternehmer, Kunsthändler, Philosophen. C.H.Beck, München 2015. ISBN 978-3-406-67714-4.
