= Jerome P. Kassirer =

American nephrologist and professor

Jerome P. Kassirer (born 1932 in Buffalo, New York) is an American nephrologist, medical researcher, and professor at Tufts University School of Medicine. He was the editor-in-chief of the New England Journal of Medicine from 1991 to 1999.

== Education and academic career ==
Kassirer received his Doctor of Medicine degree (M.D.) from the University of Buffalo in 1957, and trained in nephrology at New England Medical Center as a senior resident from 1961 to 1962. He joined the faculty of Tufts University School of Medicine as an instructor in 1961, where he has been a professor since 1974. His previous positions at Tufts include acting chairman of the department of medicine (1974–75), vice chairman of the department of medicine (1979–1991), and Sara Murray Jordan Professor of Medicine (1987–1991).

== Medical career ==
Kassirer practiced nephrology at New England Medical Center from 1961 to 1991, where he was an associate physician-in-chief from 1971 to 1991 and acting physician-in-chief from 1976 to 1977. Kassirer spent much of his academic career at Tufts University School of Medicine, where he has been a professor since 1974 and currently holds the title of Distinguished Professor. In addition to his NEJM leadership, Kassirer is recognized for his contributions to medical ethics and bioethics, being an Adjunct Professor at Case Western Reserve University.

== Career at the New England Journal of Medicine ==
Kassirer was first named editor-in-chief of the New England Journal of Medicine (NEJM) in 1991. As editor, he increased the number of foreign scientists on the journal's editorial board, which drew more submissions from foreign scientists. In 1999, he was forced to resign his position as NEJM's editor-in-chief when the journal's publisher, the Massachusetts Medical Society, chose not to renew his contract. This decision was reportedly rooted in a dispute over marketing of the journal's name.
