= Fritz Cassirer =

German conductor

left to right, Cassirer with Julius Buths, Frederick Delius, Hans Haym and Jelka Delius, 1905

Friedrich (Fritz) Leopold Cassirer, (29 March 1871 – 26 November 1926) was a German conductor. He was one of the early proponents of the music of Frederick Delius, and conducted the premiere of Delius's first opera.

== Biography ==
Cassirer was born into a Jewish family in Breslau. His father, Julius Cassirer, was one of nine children; Julius was distantly related to his wife, Julcher (Julie) née Cassirer, through a common great-grandfather. Fritz Cassirer studied music with Hans Pfitzner and Gustav Holländer, after which he was appointed to conducting posts in a succession of German opera houses: Lübeck, Posen, Saarbrücken and Elberfeld.

While Cassirer was in charge of the Elberfeld opera, his colleague Hans Haym introduced him to the music of Frederick Delius, which was little known in Germany and hardly known at all anywhere else. Cassirer, like Haym, became a strong advocate of Delius's music. He conducted the première of Delius's opera Koanga at Elberfeld in 1904, helped Delius choose the Nietzsche text for his secular choral work, A Mass of Life and organised the premiere of another Delius opera, A Village Romeo and Juliet at the Berlin Komische Oper in 1907.

Cassirer was a member of the Komische Oper company that visited London in 1907, playing Offenbach's The Tales of Hoffmann. While in London he conducted concerts, at one of which, with Thomas Beecham's New Symphony Orchestra, he presented Delius's Appalachia. Beecham, who had hitherto known nothing of Delius's music, expressed his "wonderment" and was from then on a lifelong devotee of the composer's works. Beecham praised Cassirer for having "naturally good if slightly fastidious taste".

After turning down an offer to appear at the Manhattan Opera House, New York, Cassirer retired to Munich, and devoted himself to philosophical and literary studies. He died in Berlin at the age of 55.

== Family life ==
Fritz Cassirer was married to Lilly Dispecker. They had one daughter, Eva Charlotte Cassirer, who married her father's cousin, Friedrich Wilhelm Cassirer (also known as Fritz); he was for a time managing director of the Deutsches Theater in Berlin, and Max Reinhardt's business manager.
