= Charles Kunstler =

French historian

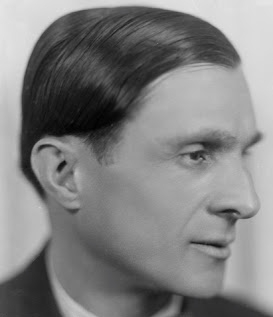
Charles Kunstler (1920s)

Charles Kunstler, born Charles François Joseph Gentes (22 September 1887, Pissos – 22 November 1977, Paris) was a French historian, specializing in the 18th century, and a patron of the arts.

== Biography ==
He was born out of wedlock to Marguerite Gentes, a servant in Bordeaux. Two years later, she married the presumptive father, Ignace Kunstler, a mathematics teacher at the lycée. Both Charles and his older brother, Jean-Eugène, were then given the name Kunstler.

From 1905 to 1909, he studied law and medicine then, from 1909 to 1913, attended the École des Beaux-Arts de Bordeaux. After graduating, he moved to Paris and exhibited at the Salon des humoristes. He was only there for a short time before World War I began, and he joined the army's health service. By the end of the war he was ill, and returned to Bordeaux to live with his family. While there, he practiced his drawing and renewed his professional ties, then went back to Paris in 1921. For several years, he wrote art criticism under the pseudonym "François de Vouillé". His career as an author had its start in 1928, when he published a book on Camille Pissarro.

During World War II, from 1943 to 1945, he was President of the Maison des Journalistes, then served as President of the Syndicat de la Presse Artistique Française from 1949 to 1957. He was elected to the Académie des Beaux-Arts in 1954, taking Seat #8 in the "Unattached" section. He was President of the Académie in 1974.

His notable art books include studies of Gauguin and Renoir. Some of his best known history books are: La vie privée de Marie Antoinette (1938), La vie privée de l'impératrice Joséphine (1939), and Fersen et son secret (1947).
