= August Gaul =

German sculptor (1869–1922)

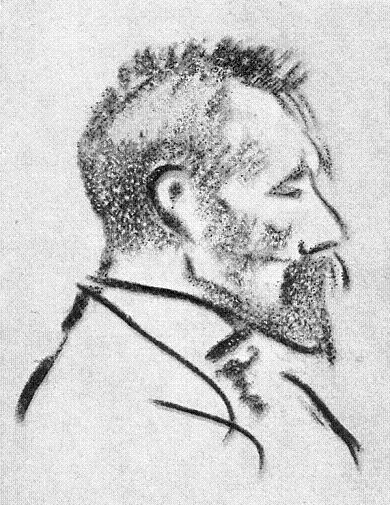
August Gaul, porträt by Heinrich Zille

August Gaul (German: [ˈɡaʊl]; October 22, 1869 – October 18, 1922) was a German sculptor and expressionism artist, born in Großauheim (now part of Hanau).

August Gaul was a founding member of the Berlin Secession. On close terms with art dealers like Bruno and Paul Cassirer, he became a leading figure in the Berlin art scene before World War I. Gaul died of cancer in Berlin in 1922.

== Works of Art ==
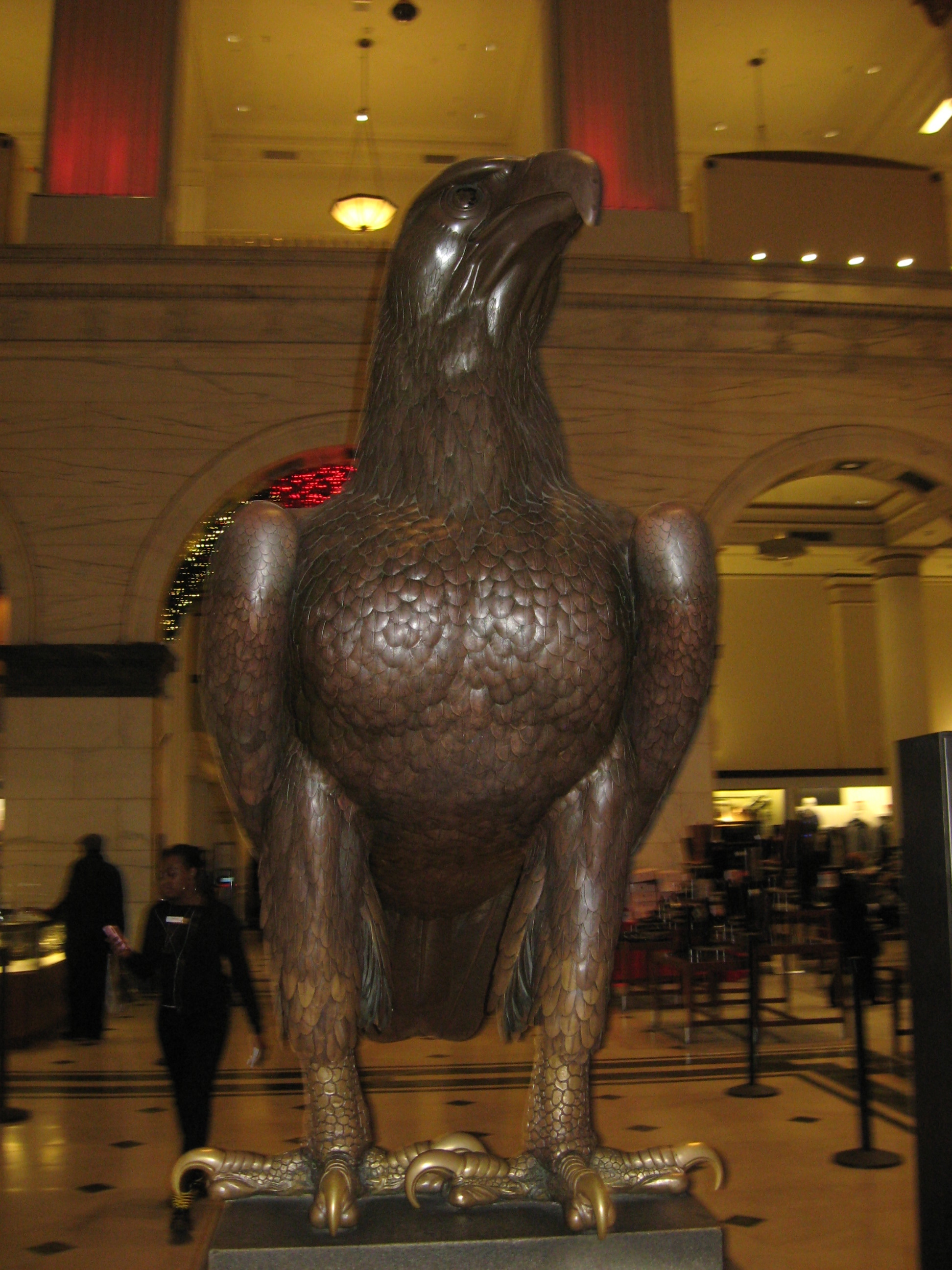
The famous Eagle in the Grand Court

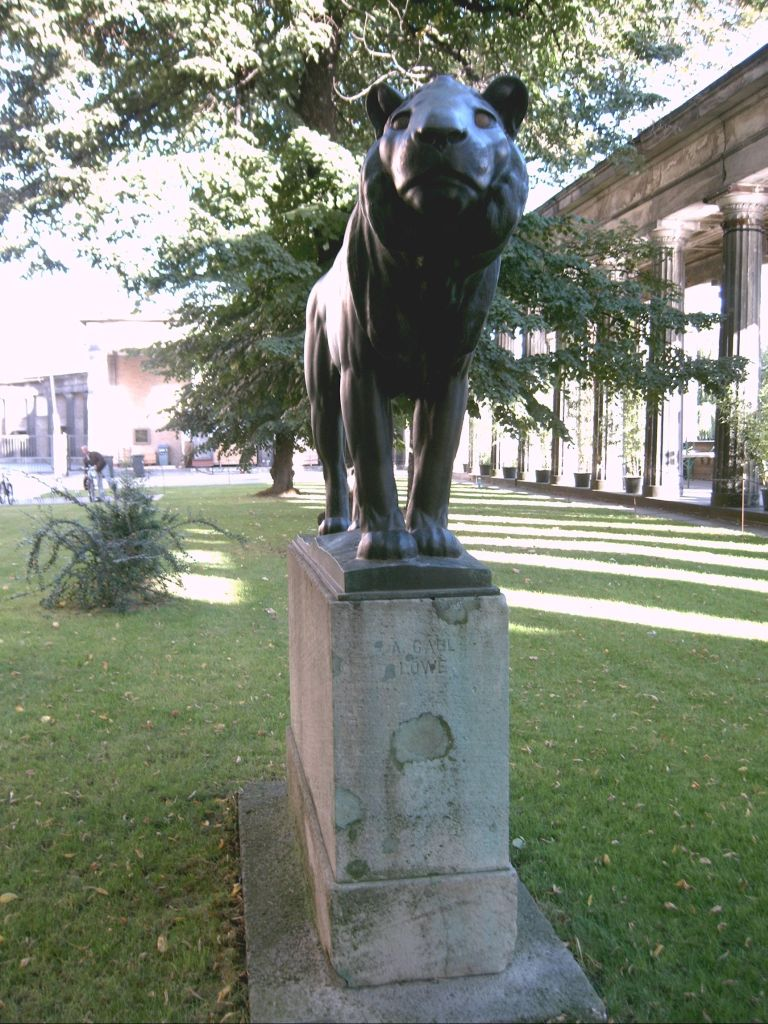
Lion sculpture in front of the Old National Gallery, Berlin, August Gaul

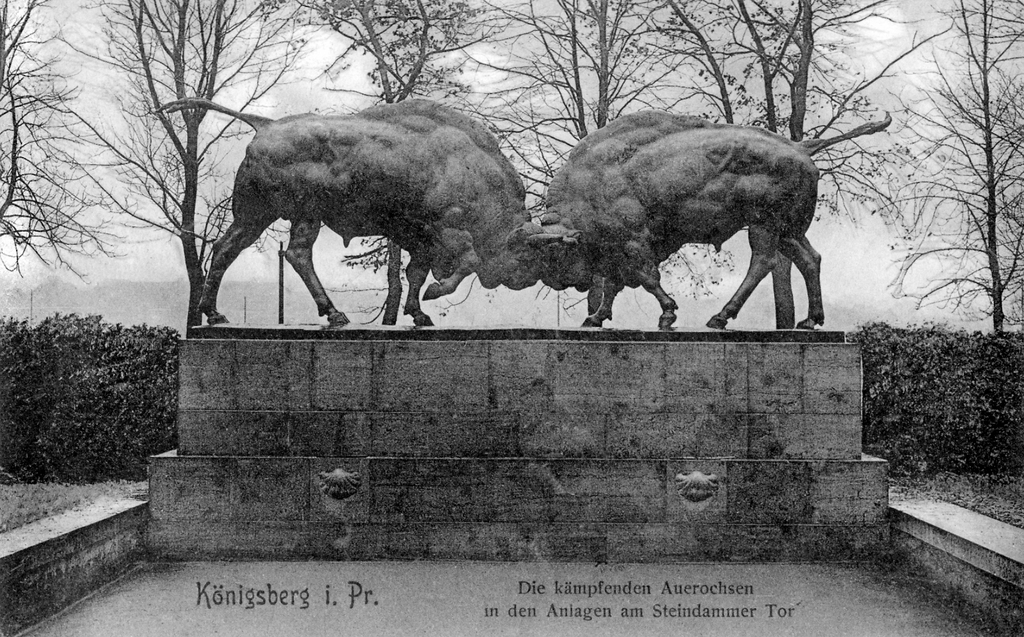
Fighting aurochs by August Gaul in Königsberg

Produced in Frankfurt, Germany for the 1904 Louisiana Purchase Exposition in St. Louis, August Gaul's "Durana" bronze eagle features hundreds of hand-forged bronze feathers and was the centerpiece of one of the many German exhibits at the fair. When the fair closed the statue weighing 2,500 pounds was purchased by John Wanamaker of Philadelphia for $10,000. The eagle was re-installed centrally in the Grand Court of what has become known as America's first department store, Wanamaker's. The Eagle quickly became the store's unofficial mascot and grew in iconic popular social context with the Philadelphian and suburban catchphrase "Meet me at the Eagle". When suburban branches of John Wanamaker's department stores opened in the 1950s and ’60s, the company installed various eagle statues in each one. The eagle sculpture still resides at the same location under ownership of Macy's and is an integral element of this store becoming the flagship within the chain.
