= Richard Cassirer =

German neurologist (1868–1925)

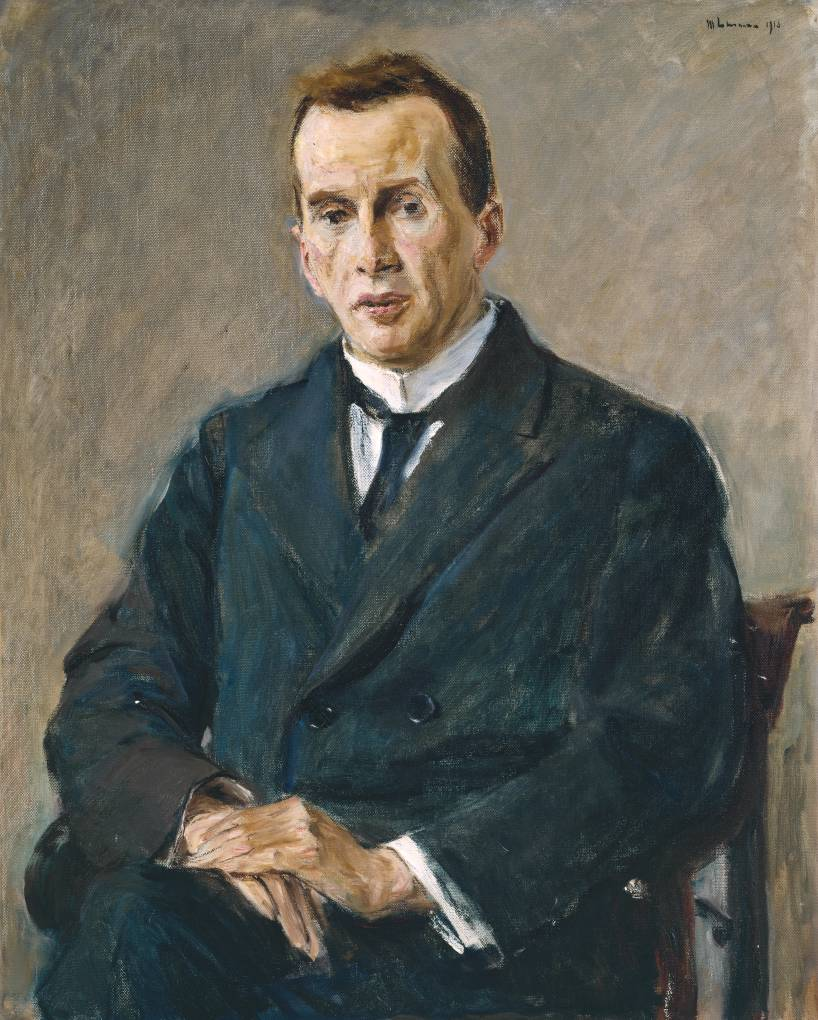
- Portrait of Richard Cassirer, painted by Max Liebermann (1918)
- Born: 23 April 1868; Breslau, German Empire (now Wrocław, Poland)
- Died: 20 August 1925 (aged 57); Berlin, Weimar Republic
- Known for: Neurology, multiple sclerosis, encephalitis, poliomyelitis
- Scientific career
- Fields: Neurology
- Workplaces: University of Berlin
- Academic advisors: Karl Wernicke, Richard von Krafft-Ebing, Heinrich Obersteiner

Richard Cassirer (23 April 1868 – 20 August 1925) was a German neurologist born into a Jewish family in Breslau.

After receiving his medical doctorate in 1891, he became assistant at the psychiatric clinic in Breslau under Karl Wernicke (1848–1905). In 1893 he relocated to Vienna, where he furthered his studies with Richard von Krafft-Ebing (1840–1902) and Heinrich Obersteiner (1847–1922). Later, he became professor of neurology at the University of Berlin, where he worked closely with Hermann Oppenheim (1858–1919).

As a clinical neurologist, Cassirer specialized on the anatomy of the central nervous system, and made contributions in his research of multiple sclerosis, encephalitis and poliomyelitis. Among his written works was a new edition (1923) of Oppenheim's Lehrbuch der Nervenkrankheiten für Ärzte und Studierende.

In 1912 he first described a circulatory disease marked by an association of ovarian insufficiency and acrocyanosis with vasomotor-trophic disturbance of the skin, and disturbances of sensitivity caused by dysregulation of the vegetative nervous system which has been given the eponymic name of "Cassirer's syndrome" or "Crocq-Cassirer syndrome".

In 1921, Dr. Cassirer was asked to give testimony in regards to the mental condition of Soghomon Tehlirian, a man accused of murdering Talaat Pasha. Cassirer maintained that Tehlirian was not sane when he carried out the crime due to a psychotic state caused as a result of his family being victims of a war-time massacre.

Cassirer's portrait was painted by renowned artist Max Liebermann in 1918, and later presented to the Tate Gallery in London.

Several other members of his family included the art dealer and editor Paul Cassirer, the publisher and gallery owner Bruno Cassirer and the philosopher Ernst Cassirer.

== Written works ==
- Die vasomotorisch-trophischen neurosen. Berlin, 1901; 2nd edition, 1912.
- Die multiple Sklerose. Leipzig, 1905.
- Die beschäftigungsneurosen. Deutsche Klinik, volume 6, page 1; Leipzig and Vienna, 1906.
- Die vasomotorisch-trophischen Neurosen. In: Handbuch der Neurologie; volume 5, Berlin. 1914.
- Krankheiten des Rückenmarks und der peripherischen Nerven. In: Julius Schwalbe (1863-1930), publisher: Diagnostische und therapeutische Irrtümer und deren Verhütung. Leipzig, 1921; 2nd edition with Richard Henneberg (1868-1962), 1926.
- Vasomotorisch-trophische Erkrankungen. In: Friedrich Kraus (1858-1936), Theodor Brugsch (1878-1963): Spezielle Pathologie und Therapie. Volume 10, page 3 [19 volumes, Berlin and Vienna, 1919-1929].
