= Self-Portrait with His Wife and a Glass of Champagne =

1902 painting by German painter Lovis Corinth

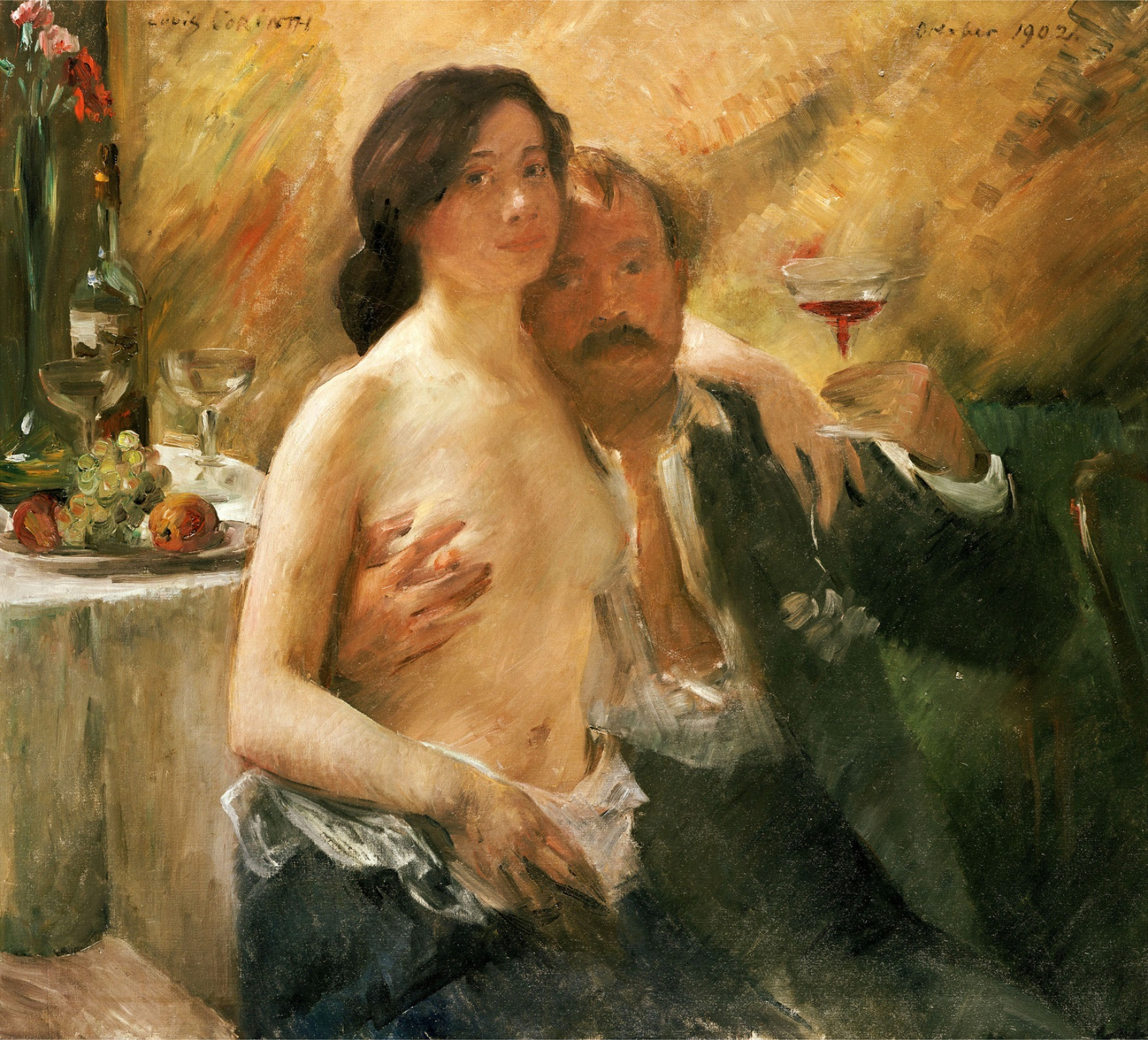
- Artist: Lovis Corinth
- Year: 1902
- Medium: Oil on canvas
- Dimensions: 98.5 cm × 108.5 cm (38.8 in × 42.7 in)
- Location: Private collection

The Self-Portrait with His Wife and a Glass of Champagne in the catalog raisonné (BC 234), (full: Self-portrait with Charlotte Berend and champagne goblet; German: Selbstporträt mit Charlotte Berend und Sektkelch), is a painting by the German painter Lovis Corinth. The double portrait shows himself and his painting student and later wife Charlotte Berend, who is sitting on his lap with her upper body unclothed and is being embraced by him while he raises a glass. It was created as an engagement painting in Corinth's studio in Berlin in October 1902, a few months before the marriage of the two sitters. The painting, painted in oil on canvas and measuring 98.5 × 108.5 centimetres, is privately owned.

== Description ==
The painting shows the artist Lovis Corinth and his later wife Charlotte Berend in the form of a portrait of a couple embracing from the front. Corinth is seated on a chair not visible to the viewer and holds a bottle with a red champagne in his left hand raised towards the viewer. Berend sits on Corinth's right thigh and holds Corinth's shoulders with her arm, her hand resting on the man's left shoulder. She is holding the stem of a flower with a white blossom hanging downwards. Corinth is wearing a green jacket and a white shirt underneath, which is open over his chest. Charlotte Berend's upper body is completely bare and her right arm is hanging down, her hand resting on the fabric of the flowing dress around her hips. With his right arm, Corinth embraces Charlotte Berend's unclothed upper body. His hand, passed under her armpit between her upper arm and ribcage, presses her breast, revealing the nipple between his index and middle fingers. He is leaning his cheek against the woman's naked shoulder, both people looking at the viewer with a smile. The light falls on Charlotte Berend's upper body, so that her shoulder and the right half of her body appear bright, while Corinth's face is in shadow behind her body and is correspondingly darker. According to Beat Wyss, the "amorous Corinth" is "snuggling in the shadow of his half-naked lover, who is sitting on his lap".

The background is the wall of a room, which forms a corner with the adjacent wall on the left-hand side. In the corner is a round table covered with a white tablecloth. On it are a bottle of red champagne, two empty champagne bowls, some flowers in a tall vase and, at the front edge, a fruit plate filled with apples and grapes; the picture is signed in the upper left-hand field and dated October 1902 in the upper right-hand margin.

== Background and classification ==
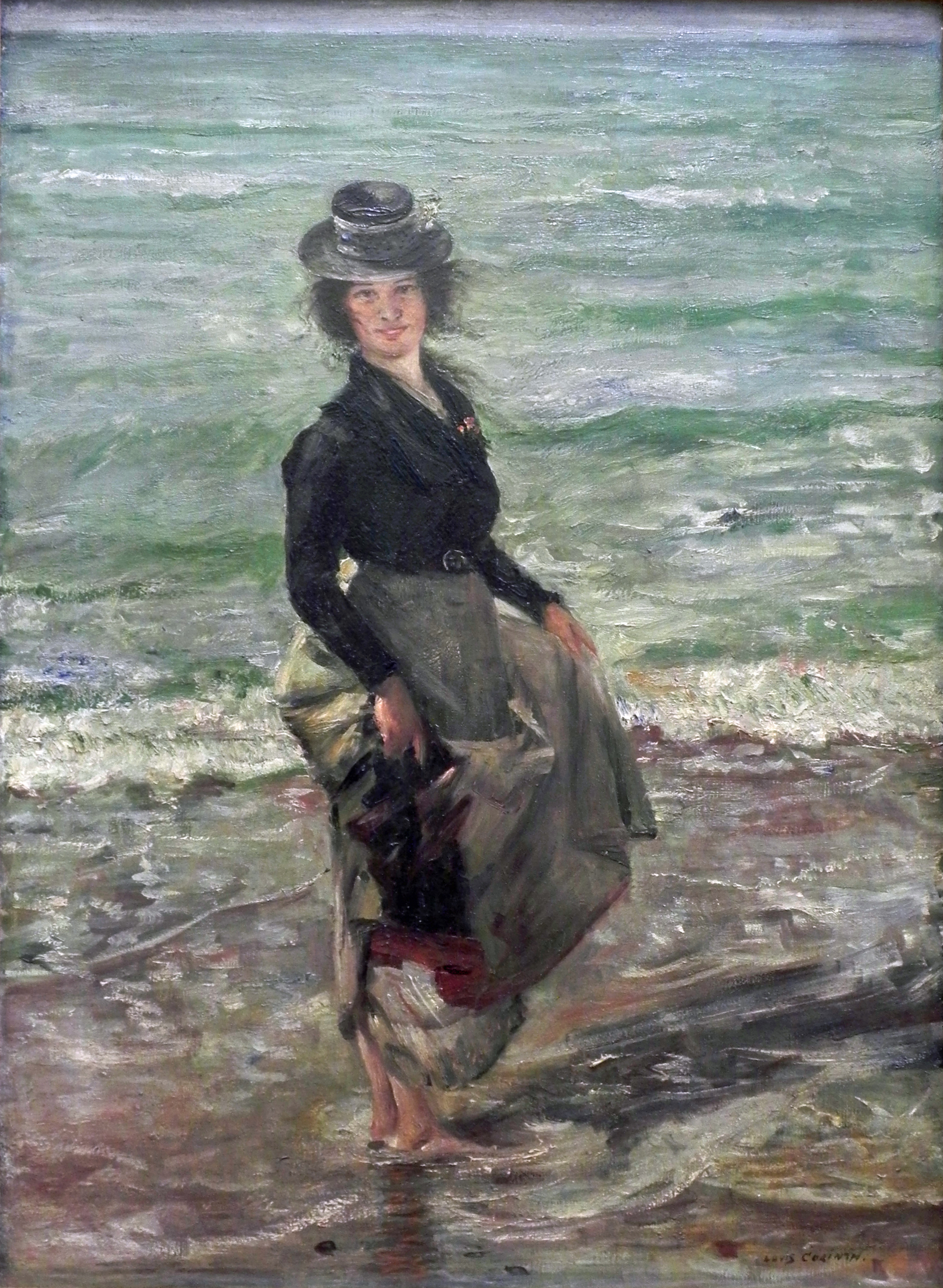
Paddel-Petermannchen, 1902

=== Chronological classification ===
Corinth's encounter with Charlotte Berend and their relationship coincided with the time when he was settling in Berlin. He had completed his studies at the Academy of Fine Arts, Munich, in the 1890s. The version of Salome he painted in 1900, a nude painting in a historical setting based on the literary model by Oscar Wilde and showing Salome, daughter of Herodias, with the severed head of John the Baptist, was not to be exhibited at the Munich Secession. Corinth then gave the painting to Walter Leistikow in Berlin, who accepted it for the Berlin Secession exhibition. Due to the great success of the work, Corinth changed his place of residence shortly afterwards and moved to Berlin.

The painting Self-Portrait with Charlotte Berend and Champagne Glass is one of the earliest paintings by Lovis Corinth in which he portrayed his future wife Charlotte Berend (1880–1967). Corinth met the then 21-year-old woman in 1901, after he had opened a painting school for young women in Berlin. Charlotte Berend, the daughter of a Jewish merchant family, was his first pupil, and she modeled for him regularly thereafter.

In 1902, he traveled with her to the Baltic Sea, where they vacationed together in Horst in Pomerania, today Niechorze. Corinth portrayed her several times that year. The painting Petermannchen and the painting Paddle Petermannchen were both created during their seaside vacation. During their stay in Horst, the relationship between Lovis Corinth and Charlotte Berend deepened and they became lovers. Berend later described in her memoirs My Life with Lovis Corinth how they both sat closely together on a jetty and she told him the story of her first marriage proposal. The painting Self-portrait with Charlotte Berend and champagne goblet was created after a short vacation in Tutzing on Lake Starnberg, an "early honey moon", and was regarded by Corinth as an engagement picture. According to her memoirs, Charlotte Berend-Corinth described its creation as follows:

Lovis asked me: 'Would you like to give me great pleasure? When he was sure I agreed, he continued: 'I have long dreamed of painting a double portrait of us, you as a semi-nude! Just as the situation arises of its own accord after a happy meal, with wine and fruit still on the table. I've already prepared a canvas for this picture, we could start right now - if it would be all right with you!' I had never met him before, or so it seemed to me as he began to paint. He was jubilant as he worked, he was cheerful and exclaimed: 'I want to paint it as it makes me happy. Look how it's progressing, how I'm succeeding, it's painting itself. Let's take a little break! I'll have a sip of wine and you too, otherwise I never drink at work, I don't need a stimulant. He laughed: 'So cheers, my little Petermann, and now back to work! He painted for a few hours and completed our heads and, like him, I could hardly wait for the next day so that he could continue painting.

— Charlotte Berend-Corinth, 1958,

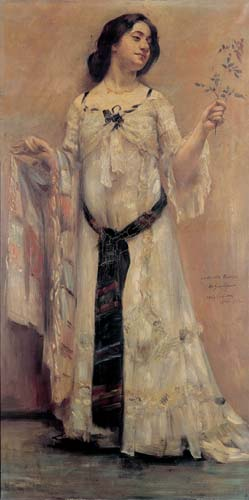
Porträt Charlotte Berend im weißen Kleid, 1902

According to his own statements, Lovis Corinth and Charlotte Berend, who opted for the double name Berend-Corinth, married the following year on March 26, 1903. According to the Charlottenburg registry office, the wedding did not take place until March 1904 - this personal "bringing forward" is explained by the fact that their son Thomas Corinth was born on October 13, 1904, meaning that the bride was already pregnant at the time of the wedding.

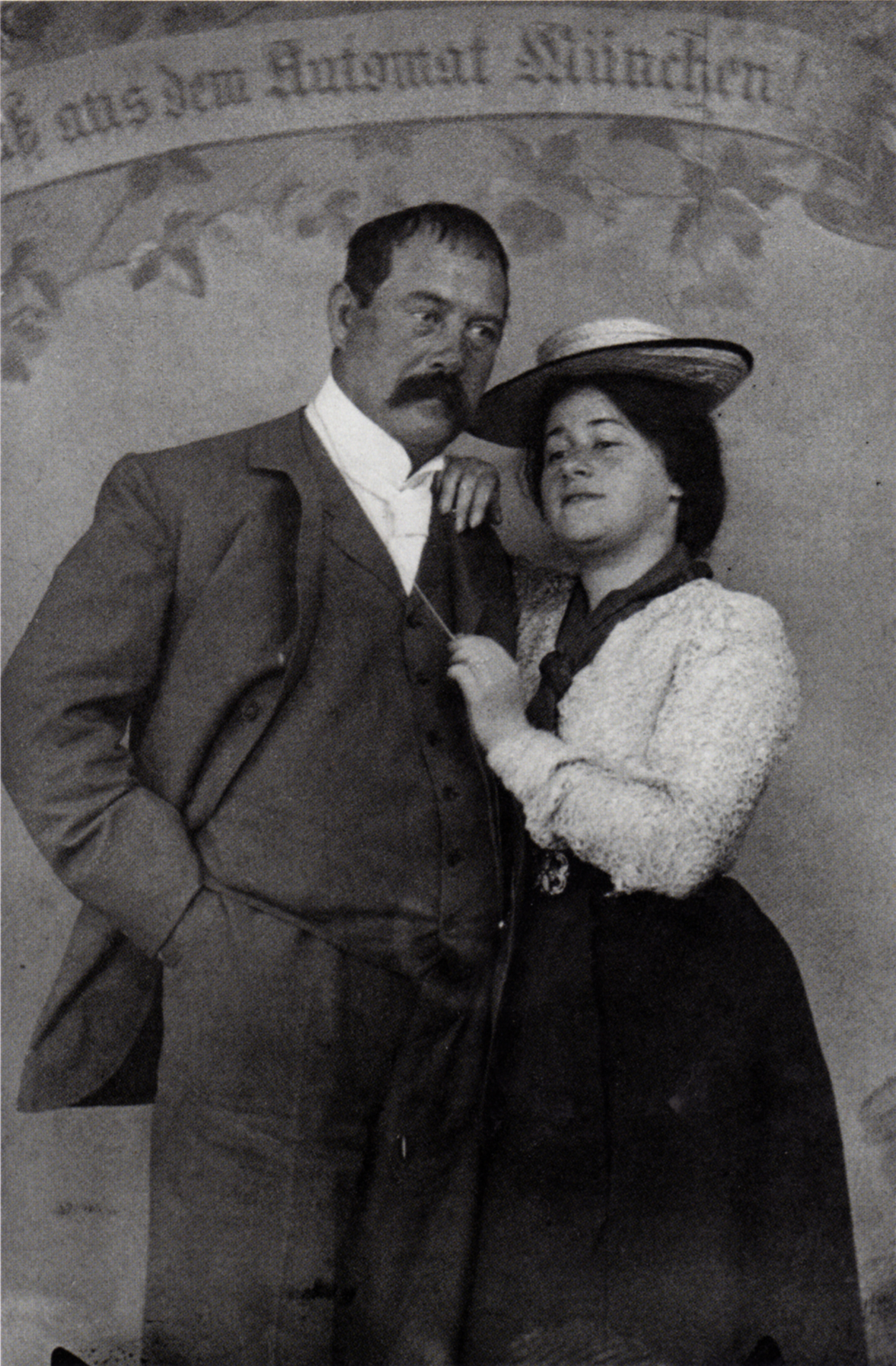
Lovis Corinth and Charlotte Berend, 1902

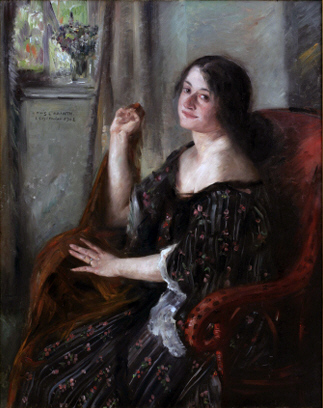
Petermannchen, 1902

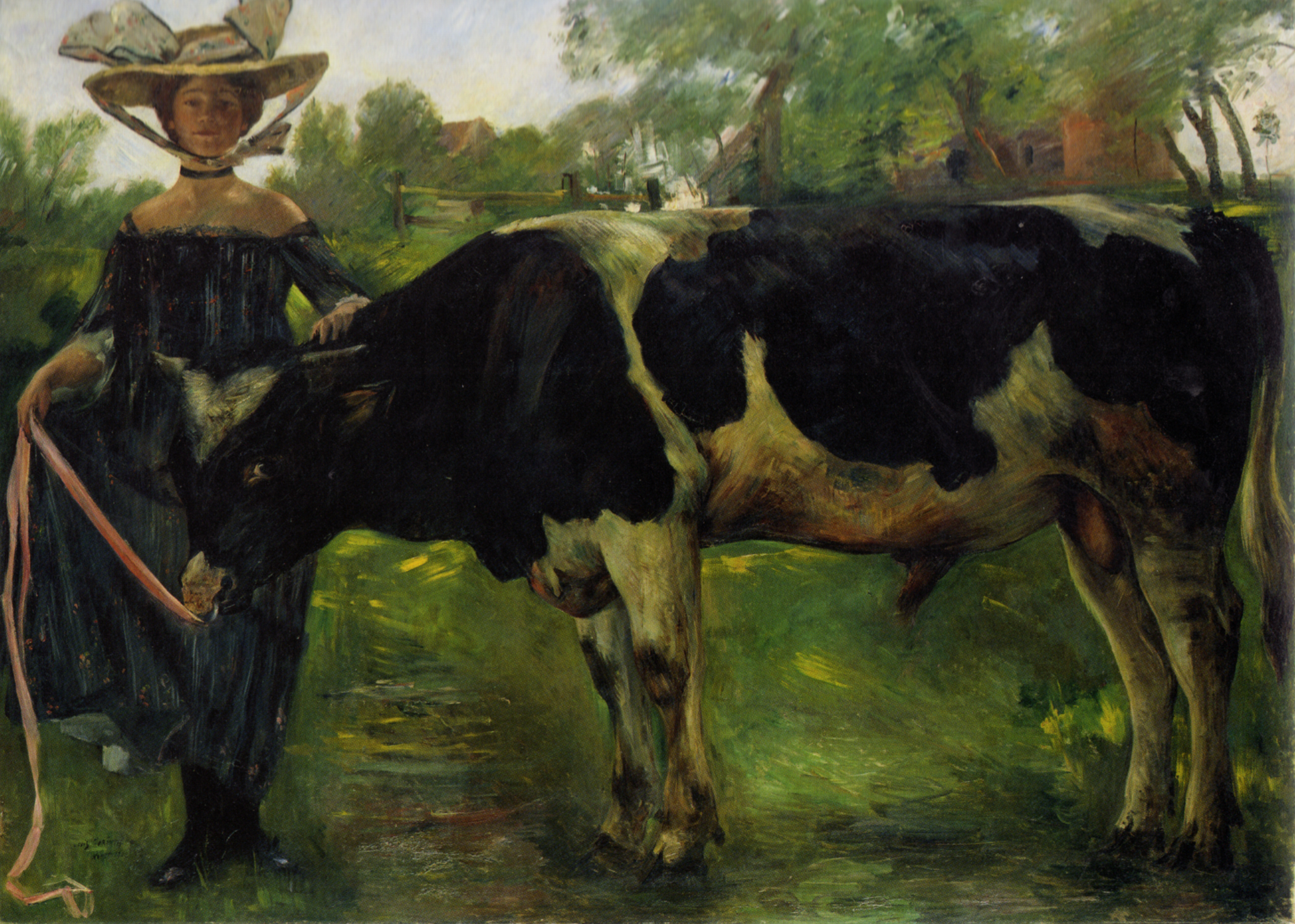
Mädchen mit Stier, 1902

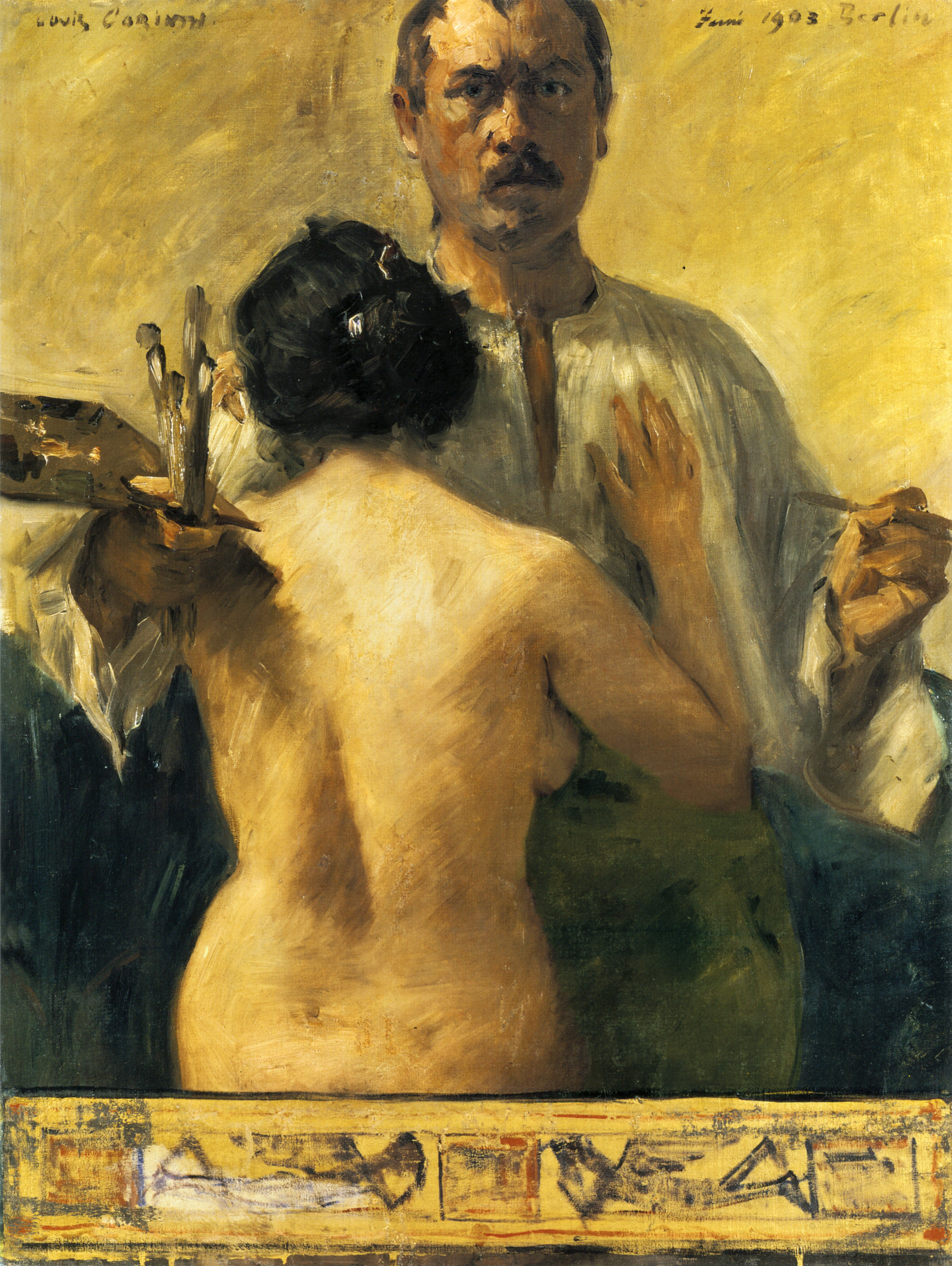
Selbstporträt mit Rückenakt, 1903

=== Classification in the artistic work ===
The painting Self-Portrait with Charlotte Berend and Champagne Goblet can be classified in many ways in Lovis Corinth's oeuvre, whereby its function as a double portrait and at the same time as a self-portrait and portrait of Charlotte Berend, later Charlotte Berend-Corinth, stands in the foreground. Corinth created numerous self-portraits, usually painting one for each of his birthdays. According to Carl Georg Heise, he left behind 42 paintings with self-portraits, as well as numerous sketches, drawings and graphic sheets with his portrait. He painted around 80 paintings of his wife, in which he explicitly depicted her - in addition, there are numerous other pictures in which she posed for him without this being particularly emphasized. He noted that Corinth's portraits turned out to be particularly passionate the more personal they became for him, and it was therefore easy to understand "which portrait models ignited Corinth's artistic genius most passionately: his own appearance and that of those closest to him."

When he met Charlotte Berend as his pupil in 1901, Corinth was already an established and well-trained painter who had already gained recognition for his works, particularly in the Berlin art scene around the Berlin Secession. He had also previously attracted attention for his self-portraits and nudes, so these subjects were not new territory for him. On the other hand, his liaison with Charlotte Berend was a turning point in his life, as he had not previously committed himself to a woman. This relationship began in 1902, and from this year onwards Charlotte Berend became a motif and model in his work. According to Charlotte Berend-Corinth's memory, he asked her for the first time in 1901 at the end of the semester if he could paint a portrait of her. He planned the Portrait of Charlotte Berend in a White Dress with her, which he later signed and gave to her. Before that, however, he painted the picture Mask in a white dress, as Berend had also brought a black silk scarf and a black mask with her dress.

According to the art historian Alfred Kuhn, who published his biography in 1925 after Corinth's death, the relationship with Charlotte Corinth marked the beginning of "a new epoch in the painter's work" and "the heavy man, the hulking giant became a child, the bull walked tamely and willingly on the leash led by a young girl". He was referring to the portrait Girl with Bull, which, like the Petermannchen, was painted on their first journey together. This picture, in which Charlotte Berend leads and strokes a powerful bull by the nose ring, attracted particular attention in the Berlin Secession because of the meaning it contained: symbolically, it showed the couple's current relationship, in which Corinth, as a tamed bull, was led around by the woman on a pink ribbon by the nose ring.

== Interpretation and reception ==
=== Reference to Rembrandt ===
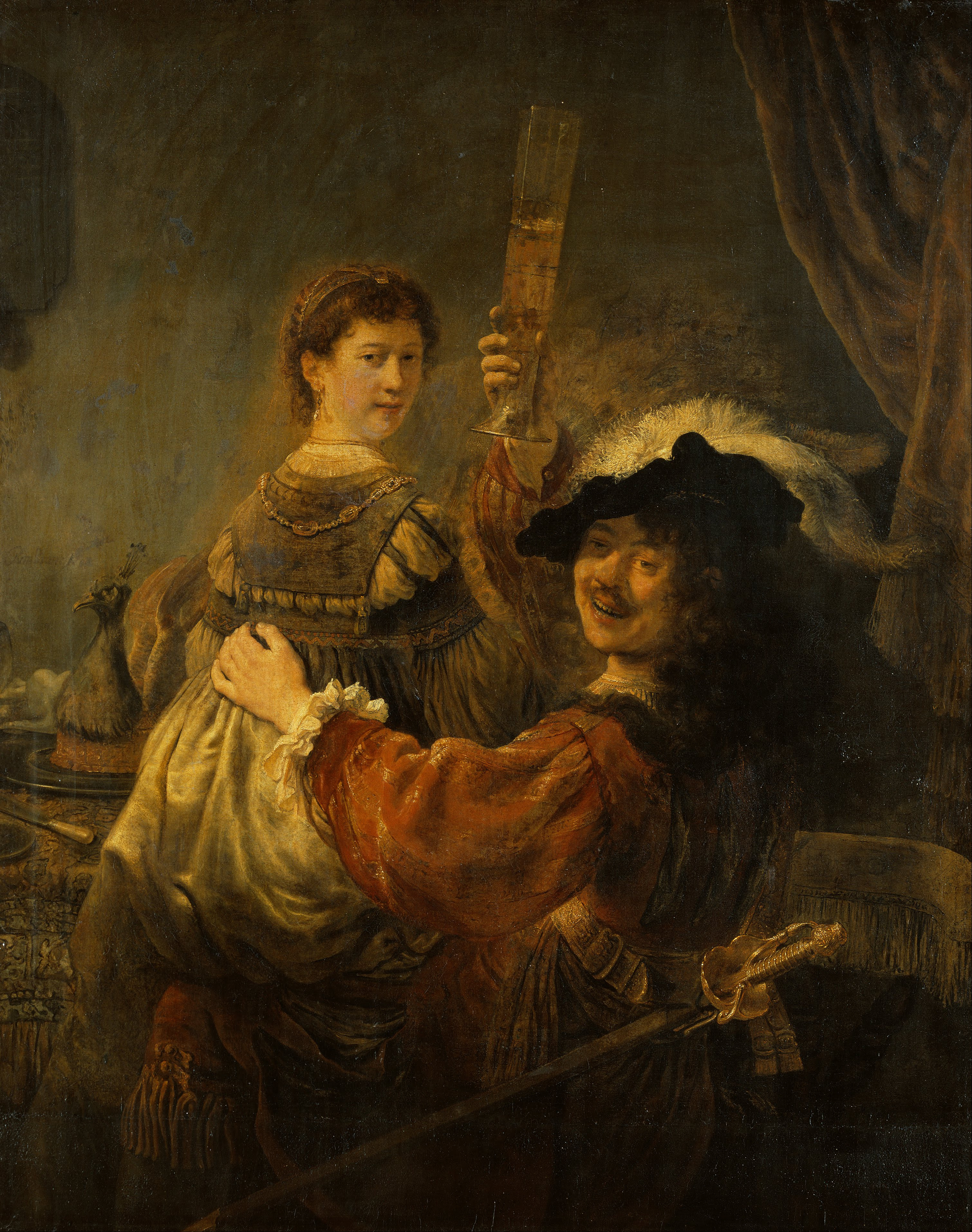
Rembrandt van Rijn: Selbstporträt mit Saskia, approx. 1635

For the Self-Portrait with Charlotte Berend and Champagne Goblet, Lovis Corinth chose a painting by Rembrandt as his model which, according to Beat Wyss, is "abundantly clear". Sabine Fehlemann, former director of the Von der Heydt-Museum in Wuppertal, also recognizes Peter Paul Rubens as a role model. In Rembrandt's self-portrait Rembrandt and Saskia in the Parable of the Prodigal Son, painted around 1635, Rembrandt portrayed himself with his wife Saskia van Uylenburgh in a scene in which she is sitting on his lap and he is toasting the viewer with a raised glass while his hand rests on the woman's hip. Rembrandt placed the painting in the context of a depiction of the biblical Parable of the Lost Son from the Gospel of Luke. He represents the prodigal son who squanders his money in the inn, Saskia is portrayed in the role of a prostitute. Corinth uses the composition and color scheme of Rembrandt's painting, but unlike the latter, he did not depict himself and Charlotte Berend in a biblical or historicizing context, but as erotic and very intimate scene. According to Gerhard Leistner, however, the two paintings also correspond in terms of content: "Both paintings are about the parable of the prodigal son in the brothel" with which Corinth "took the public risk of presenting the sensually fulfilling relationship between man and woman so unsparingly openly in the reactionary empire". According to Wyss, however, Corinth reverses the roles in the painting: "If Rembrandt, disguised as a cheerful swashbuckler, is in the foreground, Corinth seems to be completely immersed in the joy of love, wine and painting. Charlotte's shimmering skin takes center stage: the painter presents it to us as if he were King Candaules, who ordered his friend Gyges to hide behind a curtain from where he could admire his magnificent wife."

According to Wyss, however, Rembrandt had also depicted an unclothed woman on his lap in his first version of the painting of the prodigal son: "More recent investigations have established that the painting is heavily cropped. A naked mandolin player was painted over it." He had only then placed his clothed wife Saskia, whom he had married only shortly before, on his lap and thus "withdrew the blunt first version, probably for family reasons." The main point here is to avoid mixing the biblical motif of the prodigal son's low point in the brothel and Rembrandt's domestic circumstances. With his correction in the role portrait as the Prodigal Son, he therefore wanted to avoid precisely what Corinth provokes in an act of self-exposure. While Rembrandt saw himself in a role in which he portrayed his person and thus made himself the "persona of history", for "Corinth, history becomes the persona itself". The painterly details also reveal Corinth's personal sensitivities and problems: The wine glass in his left hand symbolizes the lifelong temptation of alcohol for "Corinth the drinker" and the breast in the painter's hand appears "as if the lover had once again become a demanding infant."

According to Leistner, Berlin in Corinth's time "as a rich and pleasure-seeking stage" offered the "right ambience for Corinth's vital painting". He managed to formulate his "spectacular works between fleshy female bodies and bloody slaughterhouse scenes" as a response to the "lascivious ambiguity of the salon eroticism of the prudish Wilhelmine era, which in Berlin was rather Anglo-American, puritanically asexual".

=== Understanding roles and ownership ===
As with other self-portraits by Corinth, the painting Self-Portrait with Charlotte Berend and Champagne Goblet was primarily concerned with depicting a stage in his life, in this case the beginning of a shared phase of life with his later wife Charlotte Berend. Although the painting and others of this kind would have earned Corinth "the reputation of a bon vivant uninhibitedly devoted to the pleasures of the senses", Heise considered this reputation to be false in 1958, at least in relation to this painting. He also relates it to Rembrandt's double portrait and writes that "nothing of the Dutchman's bramar-based elation can be found here, but rather an intimacy of feeling that is not diminished by the nudity of the woman, but only heightened." He sees here a joie de vivre in the realm of "domestic bliss", underlined by the "sparkling still life" of the table with the fruit and the loosened background. "The boldness of the motif may have been perceived as provocatively modern at the time of its creation, but for today's viewer, the fluidity of the luminous brushwork reveals a sense of eternity." Michael F. Zimmermann placed the picture in the context of other portraits in the family circle. He writes that Corinth is always "more than a silent eyewitness" in all portraits with his wife and family.

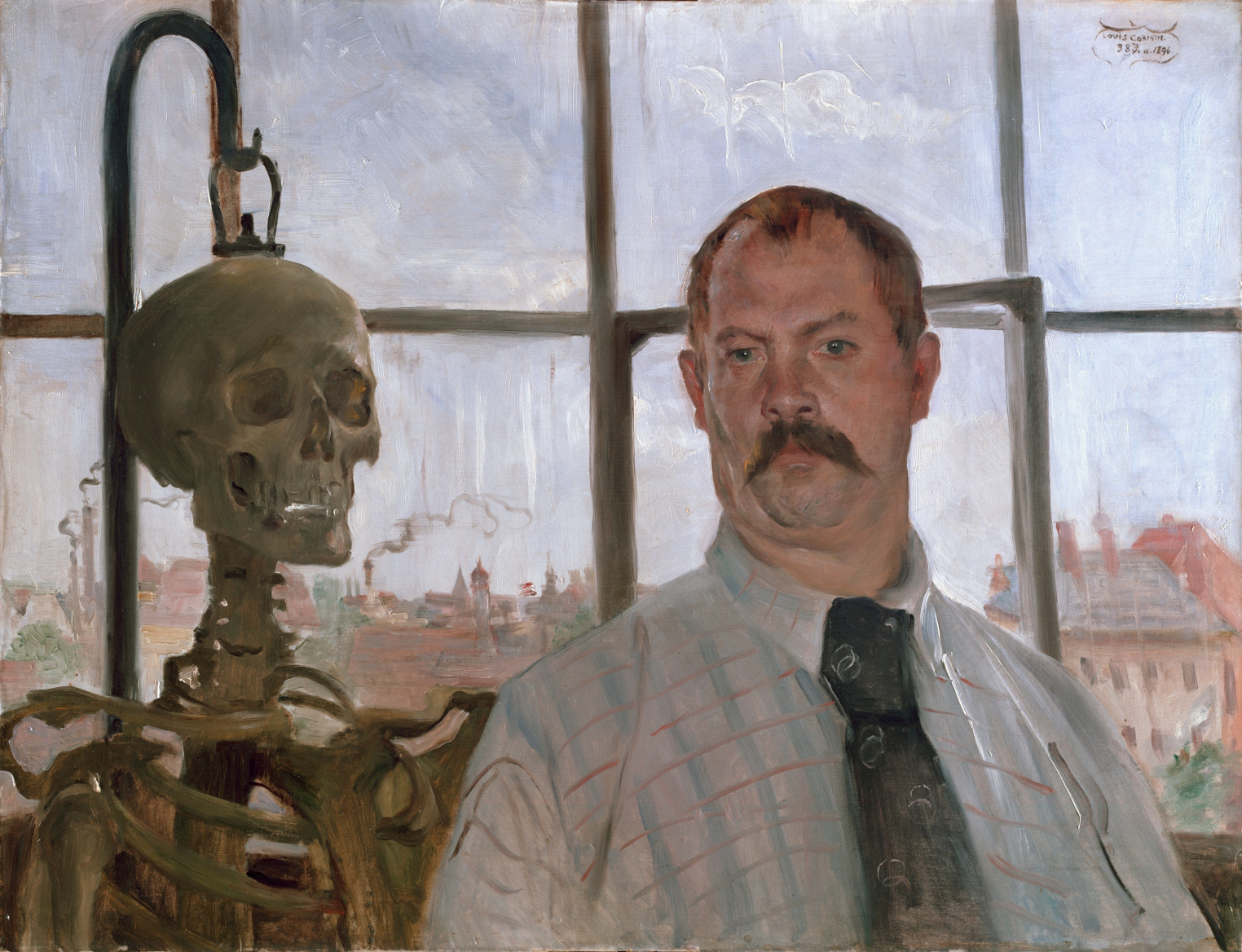
Selbstporträt mit Skelett, 1896

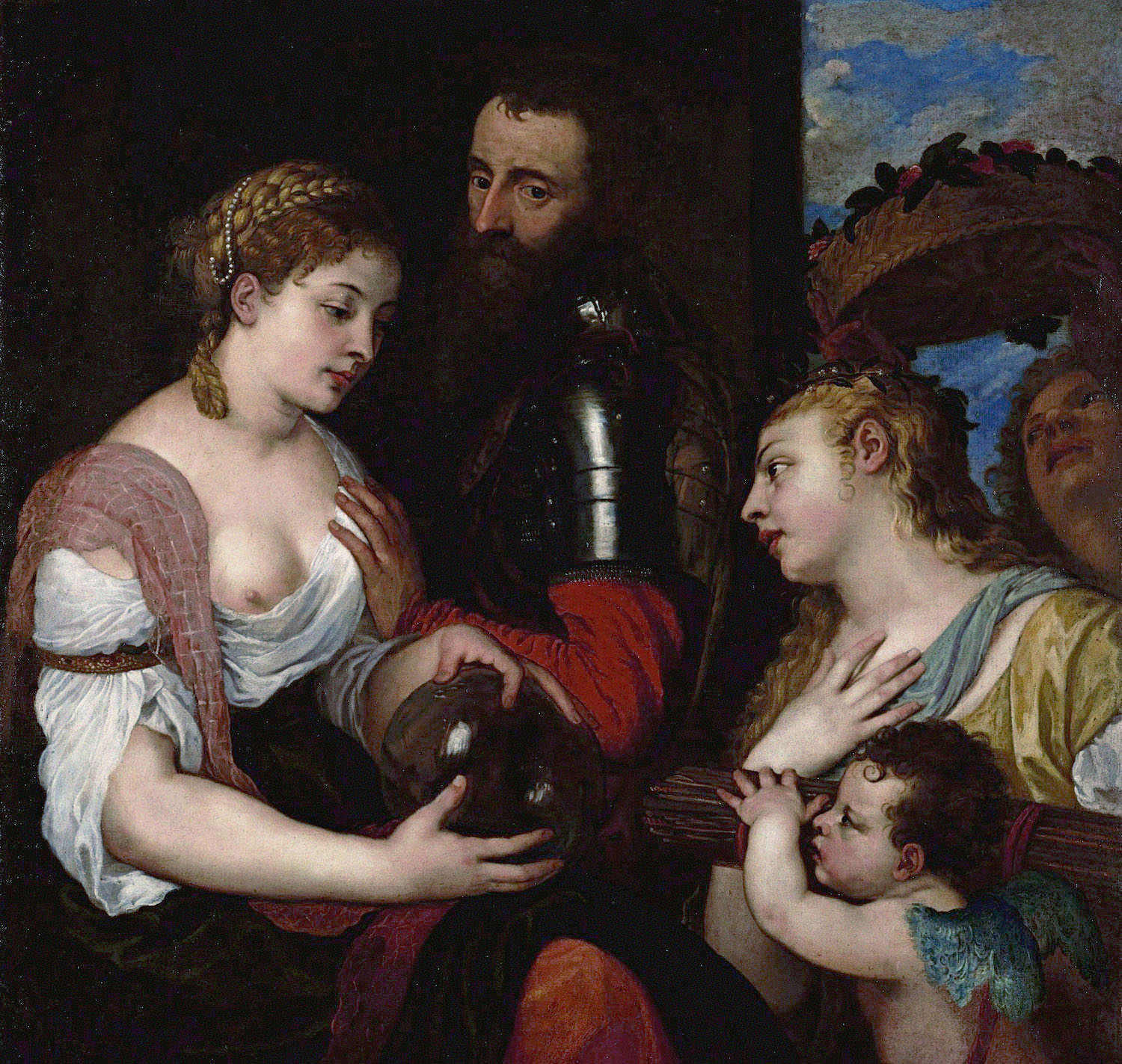
Die Allegorie des Alfonso d’Avalos after Titian, ca. 1610 to 1690

Gerhard Leistner described it as a "design of an engagement picture from the man's point of view: the artist in his relationship to and also dependence on the woman as companion, muse and model." According to his contemplation, Charlotte Berend is "the object of contemplation, study and desire" and Corinth "places his right arm around the young woman in a possessive pose [...], embraces her right breast and deliberately displays her nipple between two fingers." The painter holds a champagne glass in his left hand instead of a brush and "toasts us". In the contemporary monograph on Corinth from 1913, Georg Biermann described the painting as a "monument" to a "new calm mood that overcomes the artist's work in those moments of domestic happiness". He emphasized the "joyful sensuality" and "the scene's note of affirmation of life and joy of existence". In his view, "artistic natures like Corinth" are "thoroughbred human beings in every respect, and it would be completely wrong to express any kind of reservations of a sensitive nature towards such a creation, which has grown out of a strong feeling of happiness."

Gert von der Osten contrasted the Self-Portrait with Charlotte Berend and Champagne Goblet with Corinth's famous Self-Portrait with Skeleton from 1896 and presented it as part of a series of self-portraits with female models. According to him, the painting is "the full answer to [Corinth's] loneliness with the skeleton": "It is not the work cage that is depicted here, not the industrial and urban landscape of the window view, but the champagne and grape still life of a cozy interior, the sensual encounter with the beloved in front of the mirror, whose reflection he transforms into a painting." He also placed it in a row with Titian's Allegory of Avalos, a depiction of Alfonso d'Avalos grasping his wife's breast. He wrote: "What appears as a memorable gesture of possession in Titian's Allegory of Avalos, for example, becomes a grasp of the unveiled female breast in Corinth's work. A confession of bodily desire and possession of the beloved." He also described Corinth's facial expression as "jovial" and "pagan", "dully glowing" and "shadowed", but also made it clear that "this extreme, sometimes misunderstood language of Corinth was nevertheless of a natural purity". Fehlemann concentrates on Charlotte Berend, who she perceives as still looking critically and uncertainly towards her fate, "while he is already confidently holding up the champagne goblet at her side". She also alludes to the fruit still life in the background "as the suggestion of a promising, richly laid table" and reflects this on the undressed woman. In a similar style, Zimmermann describes him as "smiling knowingly", nestling his head on his lover's shoulder while very demonstratively caressing her breast. He also includes the still life in the background in this scene, writing: "The couple is caressed by golden-warm light, as if the still life in the background with wine, fruit and flowers had released its fragrances into the room."

Peter Kroppmanns wrote in his 2008 biography of Corinth that Lovis Corinth depicted Charlotte Berend "embracing her with his right hand and taking possession of her breast". Alfred Kuhn characterized the relationship between Corinth and Berend as early as 1925 as "possession" and wrote: "The painter has immortalized the happiness of the first possession in a series of pictures rich in relationships." This "possession" of Charlotte Berend by Corinth is also the focus of a characterization of the painting and the portraits of his wife by Simone Streck. For her, the picture, as in later portraits, clearly shows the roles of the two people. Charlotte is Corinth's wife and muse and is anchored in this role by him without being additionally encouraged in her own artistic development and career. In her opinion, Charlotte's demonstrative display is conspicuous, coupled with the clear statement that he has her "firmly under control, so to speak":

Proud of her beauty and femininity, he exposes her to the viewer, depicting himself next to her to make it clear to whom she belongs.

— Simone Streck,

The relationship between the two people is also made clear by their gaze. Her reserved and shy gaze contrasts with his serious and determined expression and the gesture of holding up the champagne glass, which further emphasizes the "unambiguousness of this connection".

Charlotte Berend surrenders to this role and is absorbed by it. According to Sabine Fehlemann, her expression in the future paintings changes from teasingly insecure to responsible and full of love. According to Zimmermann, this is already clear in the 1903 painting Self-Portrait with Nude Back, in which Charlotte is depicted "nestling naked on her back against the painter" and thus "fully assuming the role of the protective muse [that] she played for Corinth throughout her life despite her great talent as an artist."

== Exhibitions and provenance ==
The provenance of the painting is only incompletely documented. According to the catalog raisonné, it was first owned by the art dealer Oskar Moll in Breslau and later by Werner Rolfes in Frankfurt am Main. Gert von der Osten wrote in his 1955 biography of Corinth that the whereabouts of the painting were unclear and gave Rolfes as the last known owner in 1926. In July 1979, the painting appeared in a Christie's auction catalog in London. In 2008, the art gallery Nathan Fine Arts was named as the owner in the exhibition catalog of the exhibition Lovis Corinth and the Birth of Modernism.

In 1908, the picture entitled Self-Portrait with Nude was published for the first time in the magazine Kunst und Künstler: illustrierte Monatsschrift für bildende Kunst und Kunstgewerbe together with numerous other pictures by Corinth. In her catalog raisonné, Charlotte Berend-Corinth listed only a few exhibitions in which the painting was shown. It was shown in 1913 at an annual exhibition of the Berlin Secession, and in 1926 in a retrospective of the artist, who had died the previous year, at the Nationalgalerie in Berlin and at an exhibition of the Kunstverein Frankfurt. The painting appears relatively regularly in more recent exhibition catalogs, for example in the exhibition at the Von der Heydt-Museum in Wuppertal in 1999 and the joint retrospective Lovis Corinth and the Birth of Modernism at the Musée d'Orsay in Paris, the Museum der bildenden Künste in Leipzig and the Kunstforum Ostdeutsche Galerie in Regensburg from 2008 to 2009.

== Literature ==
- Selbstporträt mit seiner Frau und Sektglas. In: Charlotte Berend-Corinth: Lovis Corinth. Werkverzeichnis. Newly edited by Béatrice Hernad. Bruckmann Verlag, Munich 1992, ISBN 3-7654-2566-4, p. 88.
- Gerhard Leistner: Selbstporträt mit Charlotte Berend und Sektkelch. In: Ulrike Lorenz, Marie-Amelie Princess of Salm-Salm, Hans-Werner Schmidt (Ed.): Lovis Corinth und die Geburt der Moderne. Kerber, Bielefeld/Leipzig 2008, ISBN 978-3-86678-177-1, p. 58–59.
