= Portrait of the Artist's Uncle, Friedrich Corinth =

Oil painting by Lovis Corinth

- Porträt des Ohm Friedrich Corinth (German)
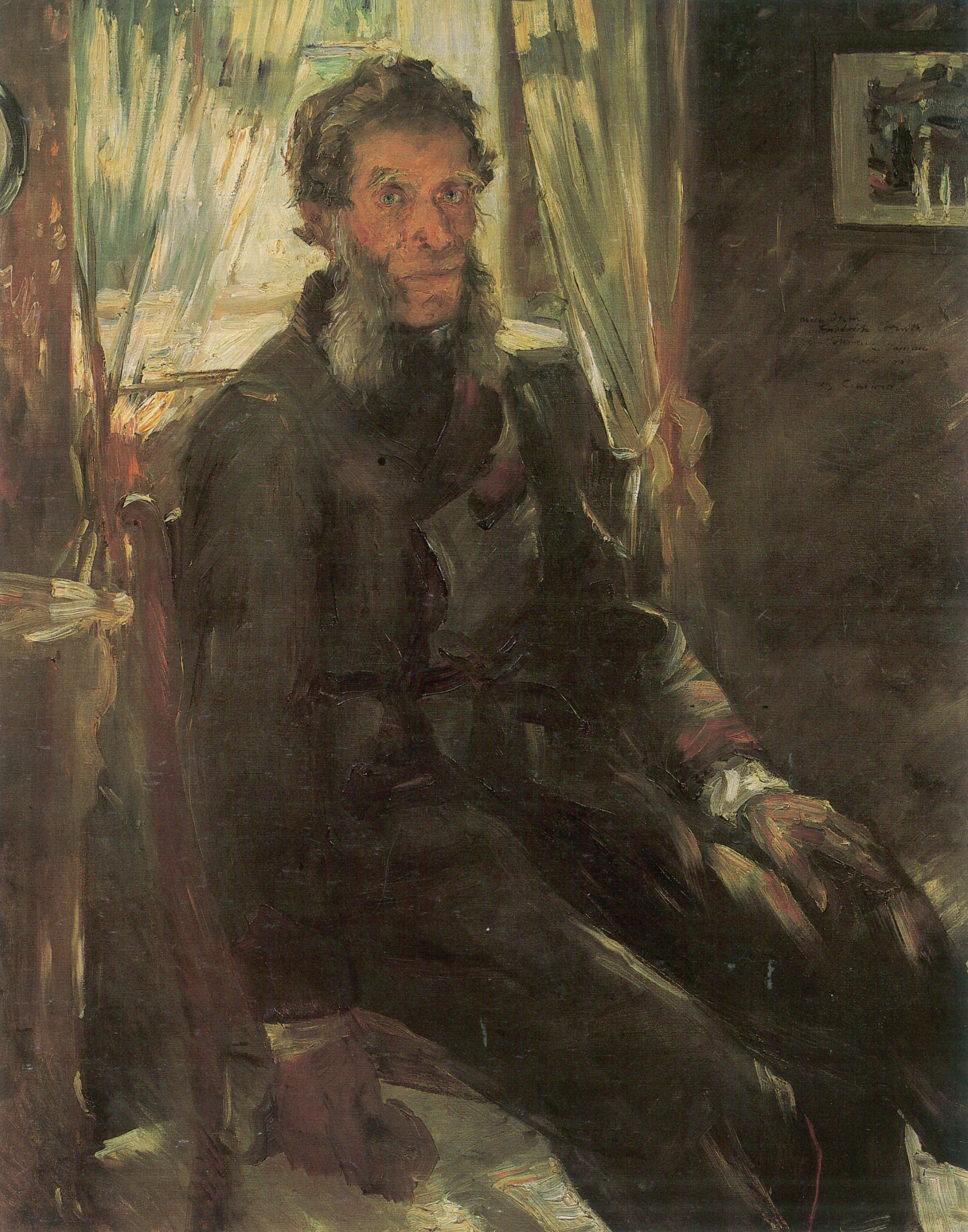
- Artist: Lovis Corinth
- Year: 1900
- Medium: oil on canvas
- Dimensions: 98 cm × 79 cm (39 in × 31 in)
- Location: East Prussian Regional Museum, Lüneburg

The Portrait of the Artist's Uncle, Friedrich Corinth (German: Porträt des Ohm Friedrich Corinth) is an oil painting by the German painter Lovis Corinth. It is executed in portrait format on canvas and measures 98 × 79 centimeters. The portrait of his Ohm (maternal uncle) was created in 1900 during a visit by the artist to his uncle in Moterau (today Sabarje) in East Prussia. It was owned by the Corinth family until 1987, most recently by Wilhelmine Corinth in New York City. It was then purchased by the German federal government for the newly founded Ostpreußisches Landesmuseum, in Lüneburg, in whose collection it remains.

== Image description ==
The painting shows Friedrich Corinth, the artist's uncle, sitting on a wooden chair in his living room. He is dressed in a brown robe and sits in the backlight in front of an open and brightly lit window. The right arm hangs down, the left lies on the left thigh and closes the body form. The light from the window divides the room into a bright left side and a darker right side, emphasizing the face and the left hand in particular and the posture on the chair. The body is concealed by the gray skirt, contours are kept "vague". The face is turned towards the viewer and the painter, the light blue eyes are open and look directly at the painter and the viewer. It is framed by the thick gray hair and the strong whiskers, which leaves the chin free. Charlotte Berend-Corinth also mentions the bright light blue eyes and the luxuriant dark gray hair in her catalog raisonné.

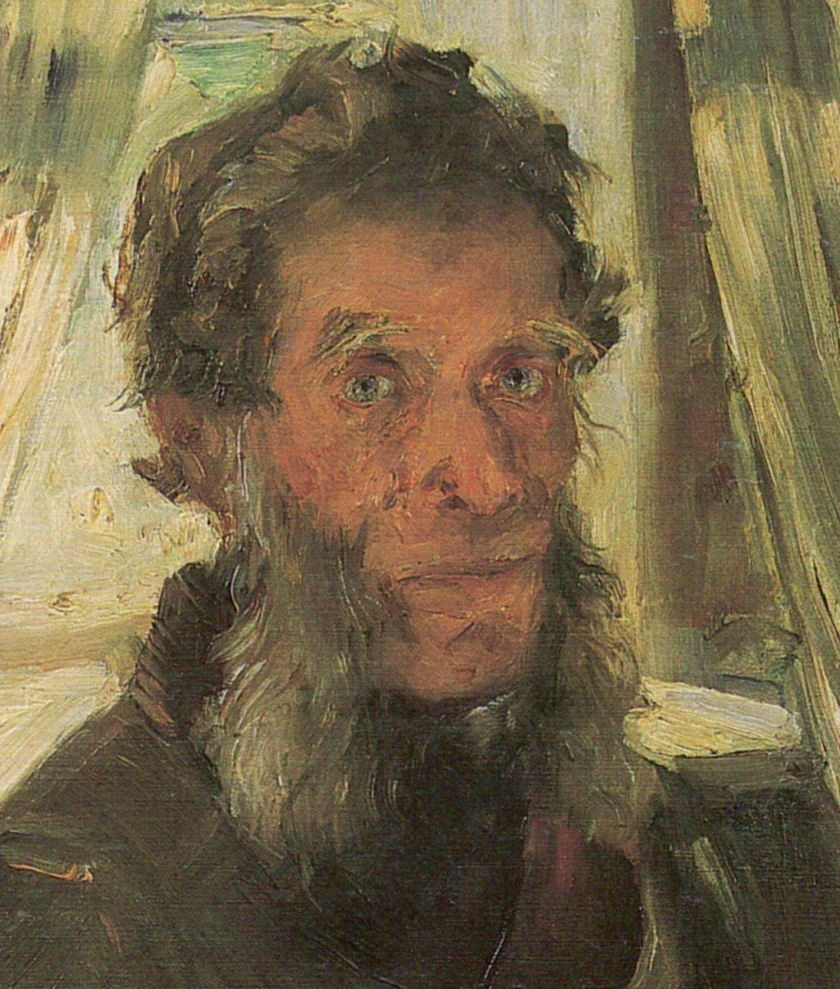
Detail section head

The furniture in the room is only vaguely recognizable. To the right of the wooden chair is a waist-high chest of drawers or a table, the bright window behind the uncle ends at about the same height with a window sill and is lined with light-colored curtains, which are painted "in bright yellow" according to Charlotte Berend-Corinth. On the wall to the left of the sitter is a picture showing a person standing in front of a lake. The picture is signed and inscribed in several lines on the upper right-hand edge with "Mein Ohm 78 J. a Moterau bei Tapiau Juli 1900 Lovis Corinth".

== Interpretation ==
The art historian Andrea Bärnreuther interprets the use of backlighting and the uncle's figure, which is thus only vaguely recognizable, as "the painting's [and artist's] restraint in respecting the dignity of the person", which "leaves the sitter with the mystery of life, which eludes definition". She continues: "In the calm composure of someone waiting for death, the Ohm turns his face towards the viewer with his eyes wide open and his mouth slightly parted. It is the look of a person who has lived his life - the look of a life on call."

Bärnreuther goes on to explain that "by including the interior in the depiction", Corinth opens the view "beyond the mental and physical appearance of the ageing man into the seclusion of his limited domestic sphere, which shows the sitter on the margins of society". She describes this society as "undergoing change", which sees "the cult of youth" coming through "the disintegration of the old order". She relates the painting to the Portrait of the Poet Peter Hille painted by Corinth two years later. With both, Corinth succeeded "in making inroads into the depiction of social existence with the conception of the portrait as a gesture in social space".

Sabine Fehlemann, the former director of the Von der Heydt-Museum in Wuppertal, placed the painting in the context of Corinth's artistic development. Together with the paintings Portrait of Mother Rosenhagen and The Violinist, in which he portrayed Margarete Marschalk, the later wife of Gerhart Hauptmann, the Portrait of Ohm Friedrich Corinth shows for her how he "also increasingly abandons the fixed academic form of composition in the portrait in order to allow mood and atmosphere to flow in more and more."

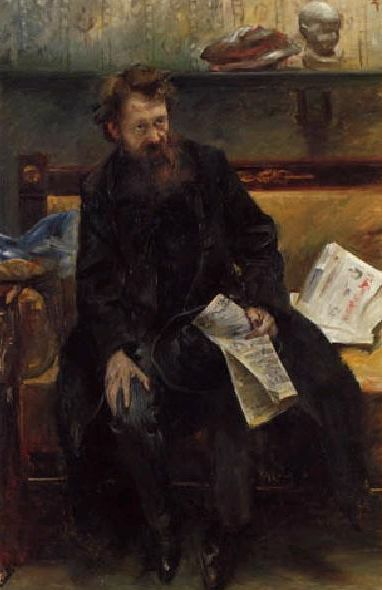
Porträt des Dichters Peter Hille, 1902

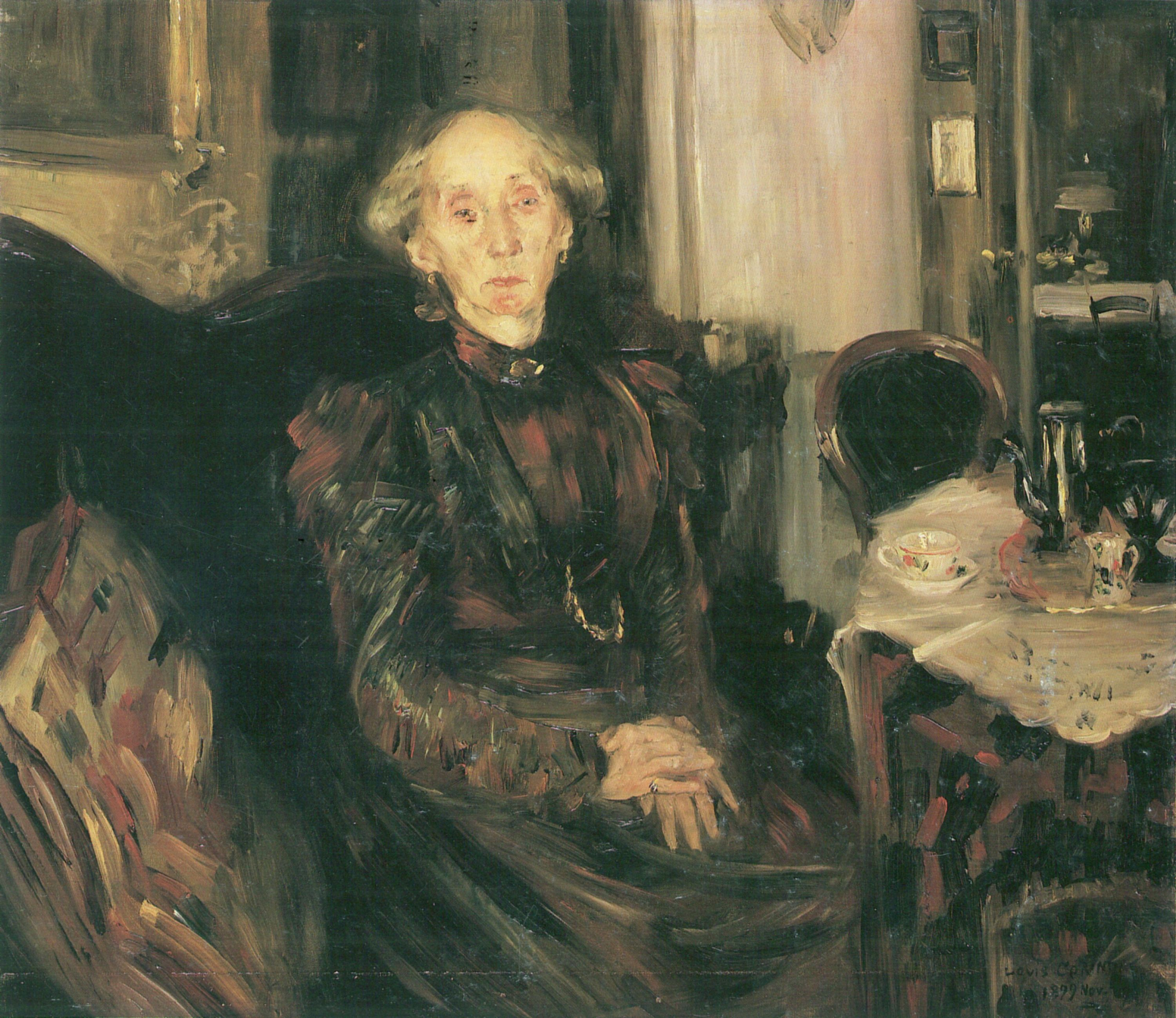
Porträt der Mutter Rosenhagen, 1899

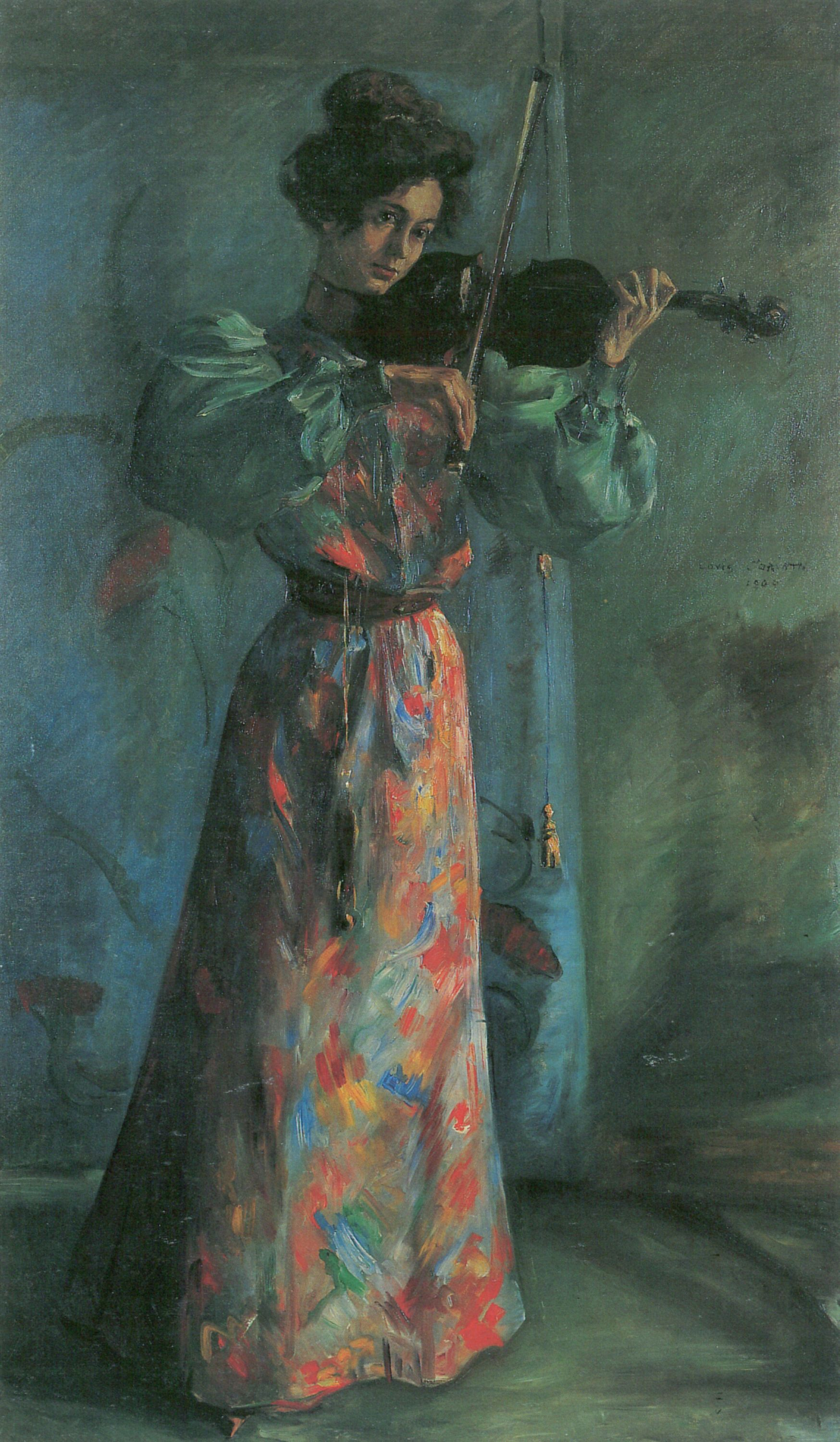
Die Geigenspielerin, 1900

== Background and origin ==
=== The uncle and aunt in Moterau ===
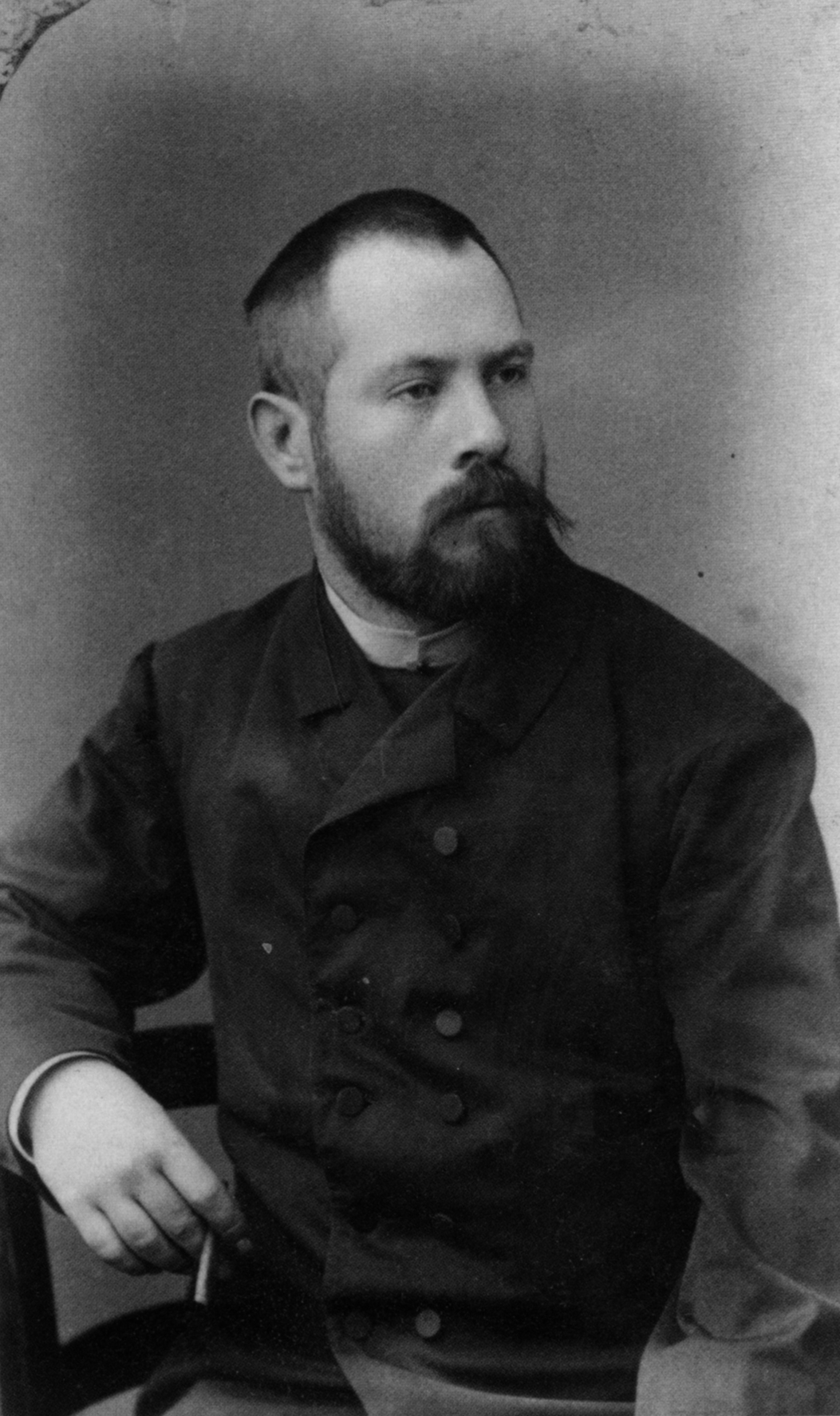
Lovis Corinth (1887)

Lovis Corinth painted the Portrait of Ohm Friedrich Corinth during a stay with his uncle in July 1900. Lovis Corinth came from an agricultural family in Tapiau in East Prussia, today Gwardeisk. His father was a farmer and, through marriage to his mother, a widow, also a local tanner. Corinth's relatives lived in the surrounding villages. His uncle Friedrich Corinth was also a farmer and lived in Moterau (now Sabarje). Lovis Corinth visited them regularly and also described them in his childhood memories as an anecdote to the visits on high holidays:

On high holidays, our closest relatives, the Ohm and the aunt from Moterau, regularly came to visit and go to church. It was always a fun morning for me: everyone got dressed up to go to church. My father would stand in front of the mirror, his face soaped up, and shave. I had a lot of fun watching him do this. Sometimes he pulled his lip long and turned towards the light, scraping off the stubble, sometimes he rounded one cheek so that the razor glided over it more evenly. The Ohm had no need of this, for he wore a full beard. At this time they also took the opportunity to cut each other's hair. After the laborious business, the semi blond hair lay on the floor as if many Simsons had had to let their locks down. After church, a better meal was served with a pewter mug of brown ale, and the sermon was harshly rehearsed, with hardly a good word said about the priest. Towards evening they said goodbye to each other with kisses and handshakes. The visitor got into the car and was followed for a long time until the carriage had disappeared behind the flower garden and behind Kaft's hill.

Corinth portrayed his uncle and aunt as early as 1880 in two of his earliest oil sketches as Portrait of Ohm in Moterau and Portrait of the aunt in Moterau. He began his artistic training in 1876 at the Royal Academy of Art in Königsberg, today Kaliningrad, and remained there until 1880, when he went to Munich on the recommendation of his teachers. The two paintings, each measuring 42 cm × 32 cm, remained with his relatives in Moterau after completion and were later passed on to one R. Stange in Heiligenbeil, today Mamonowo. The later and current whereabouts of both portraits are unknown. The art historian Alfred Kuhn published a pencil drawing from 1879 in his Corinth monograph of 1925, which shows the aunt, Ohm and an "Otto" in Moterau. Drawings of the stables and kitchen on his uncle's farm date from the same year. Charlotte Berend-Corinth noted in her catalog raisonné Lovis Corinth: The Paintings that these two paintings were the first works by Corinth that she had noted down together with the artist. She also points out that it is the same uncle who was portrayed in the Portrait of Ohm Friedrich Corinth by Lovis Corinth.

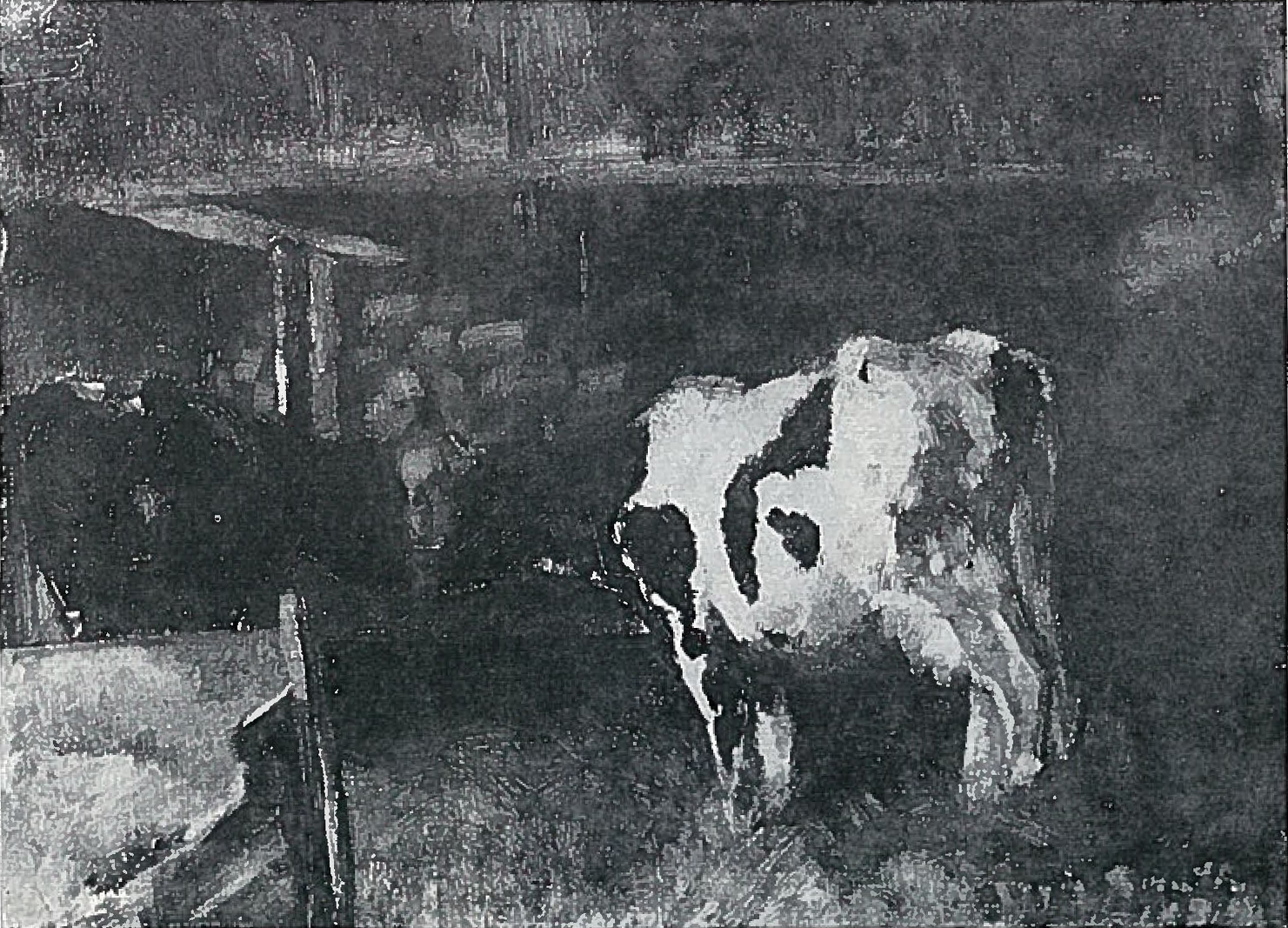
Kuhstall, Ölgemälde von 1879

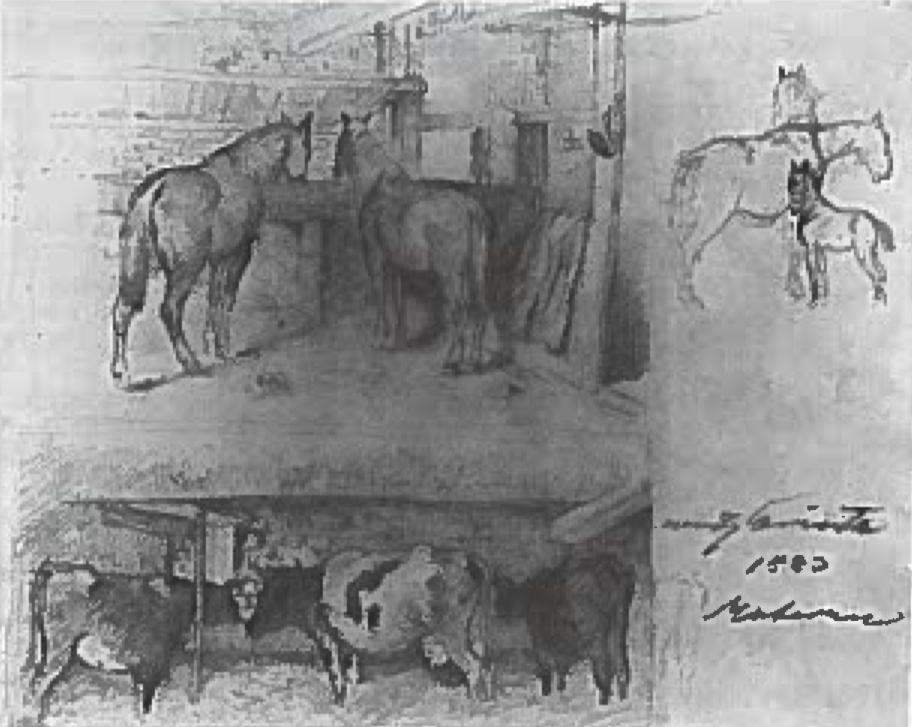
Die Ställe (Interieur), Zeichnung von 1879

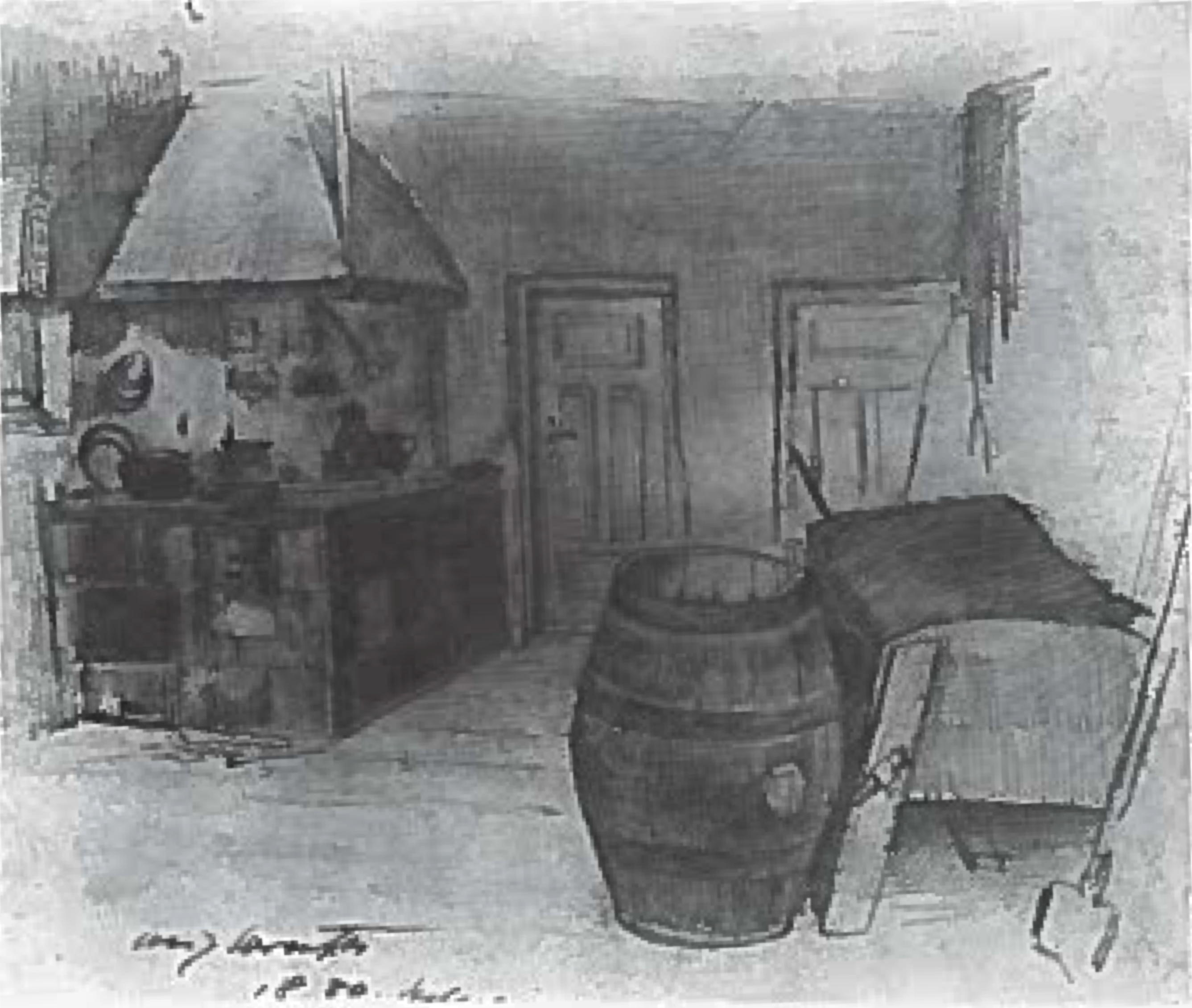
Die Küche (Interieur), Zeichnung von 1879

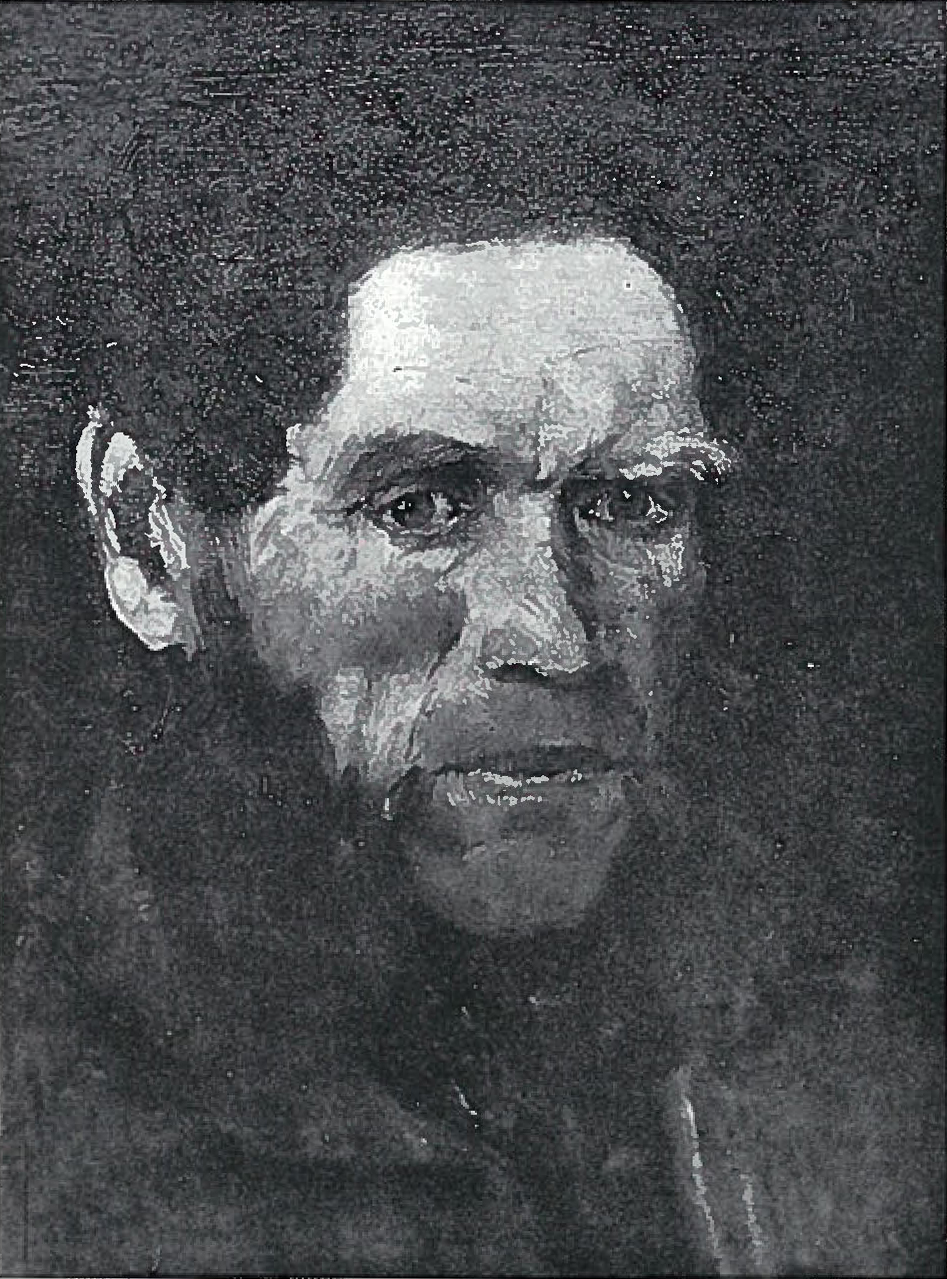
Porträt des Ohm in Moterau, Ölgemälde von 1880

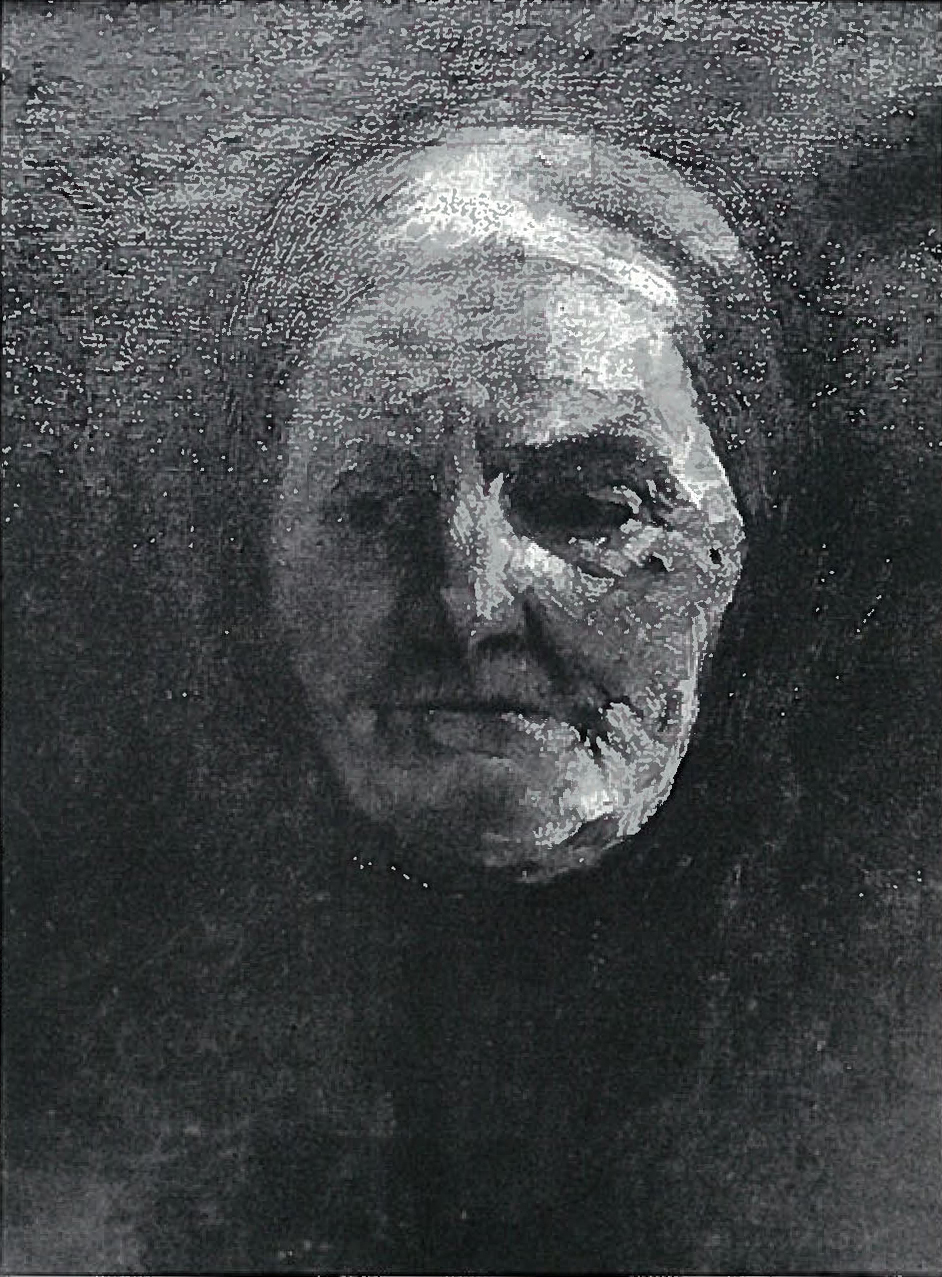
Porträt der Tante in Moterau, Ölgemälde von 1880

=== Chronological placement in Corinth's oeuvre ===
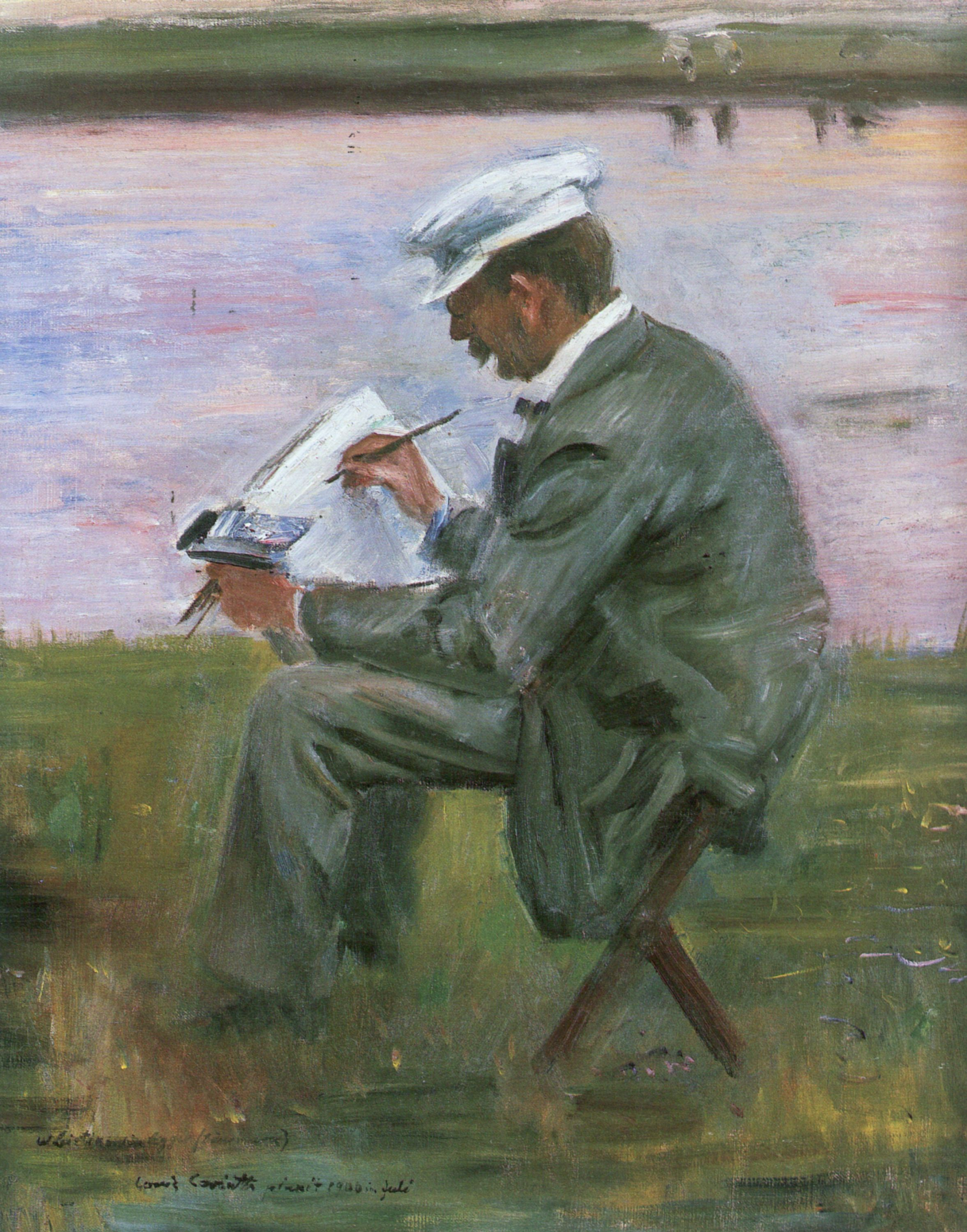
Porträt des Malers Walter Leistikow, 1900

At the time the painting was created, Lovis Corinth's life was in upheaval. From the beginning of his studies at the Academy of Fine Arts, Munich, he tried to gain recognition in the Munich art scene, but found it difficult to establish himself there. At the end of the 1890s, he intensified his contacts with the painters Walter Leistikow and Ernst Liebermann in Berlin, who founded the Berlin Secession there in 1898 and showed a strong interest in Corinth's participation. At the time of the painting's creation, Corinth was traveling in Königsberg and the surrounding area, having previously spent some time at the Schulzendorf estate in Brandenburg as a lodging guest of Richard Israel's family, where he also met with Leistikow. The Königsberg trip was immediately followed by a joint trip with Leistikow to Denmark. In 1900, Corinth painted several portraits, including one of his famous self-portraits. Among the people portrayed during this period were mainly artists and writers from Corinth's circle in Munich and Berlin, including Eduard Graf von Keyserling, Gerhart Hauptmann and Walter Leistikow.

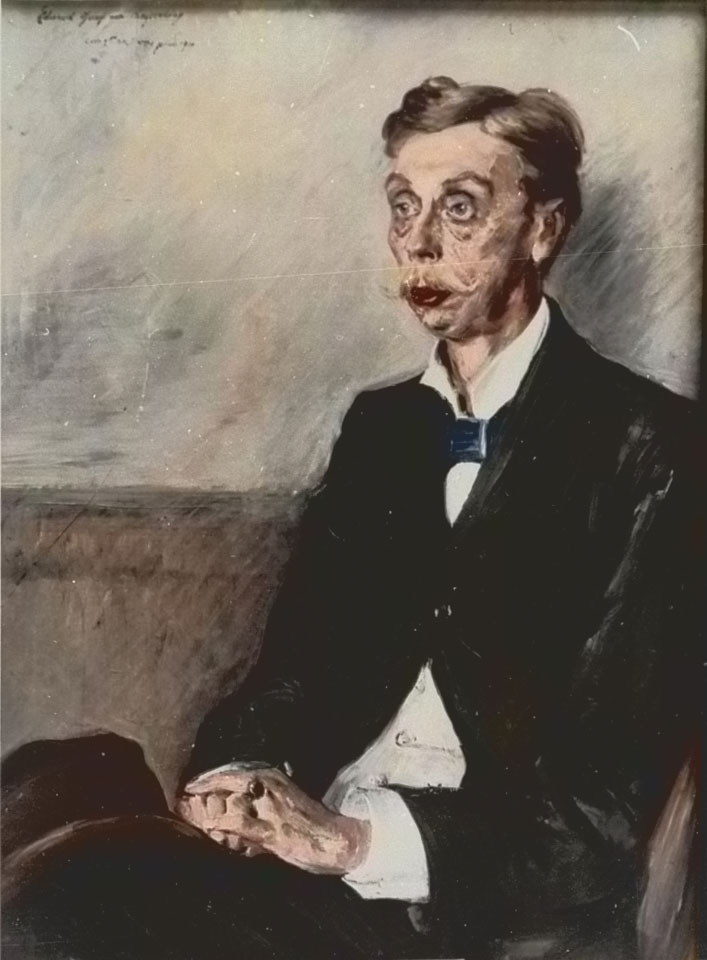
Porträt Eduard Graf von Keyserling, 1900

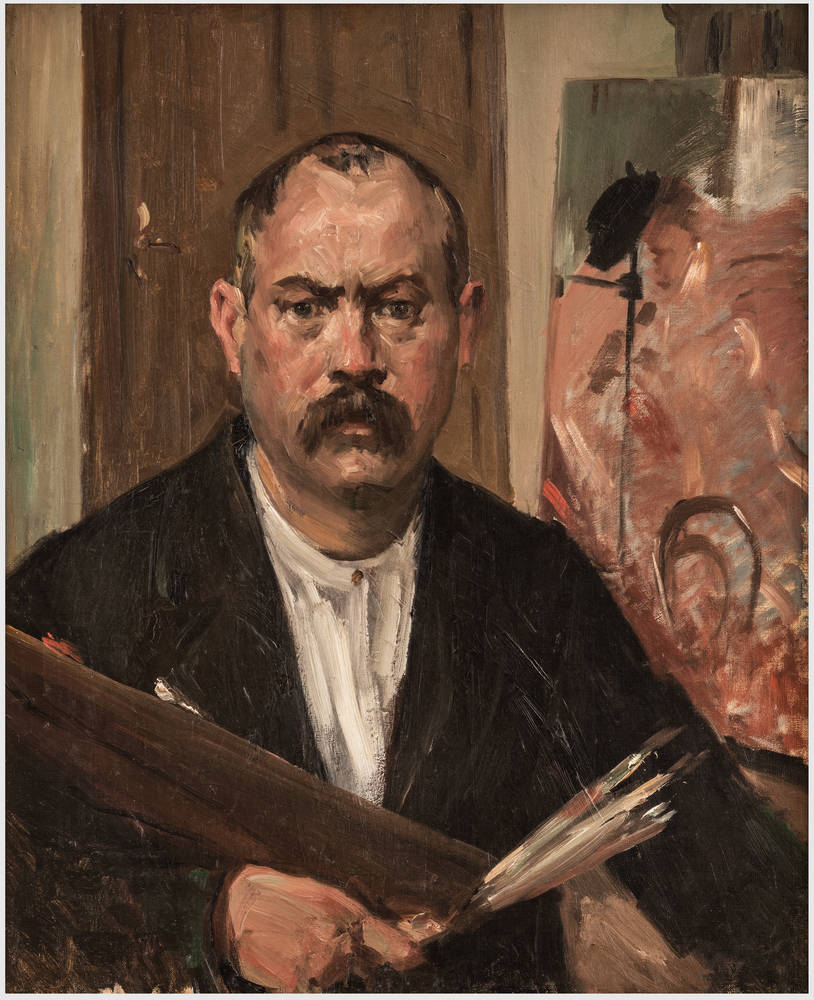
Selbstporträt ohne Kragen, 1900

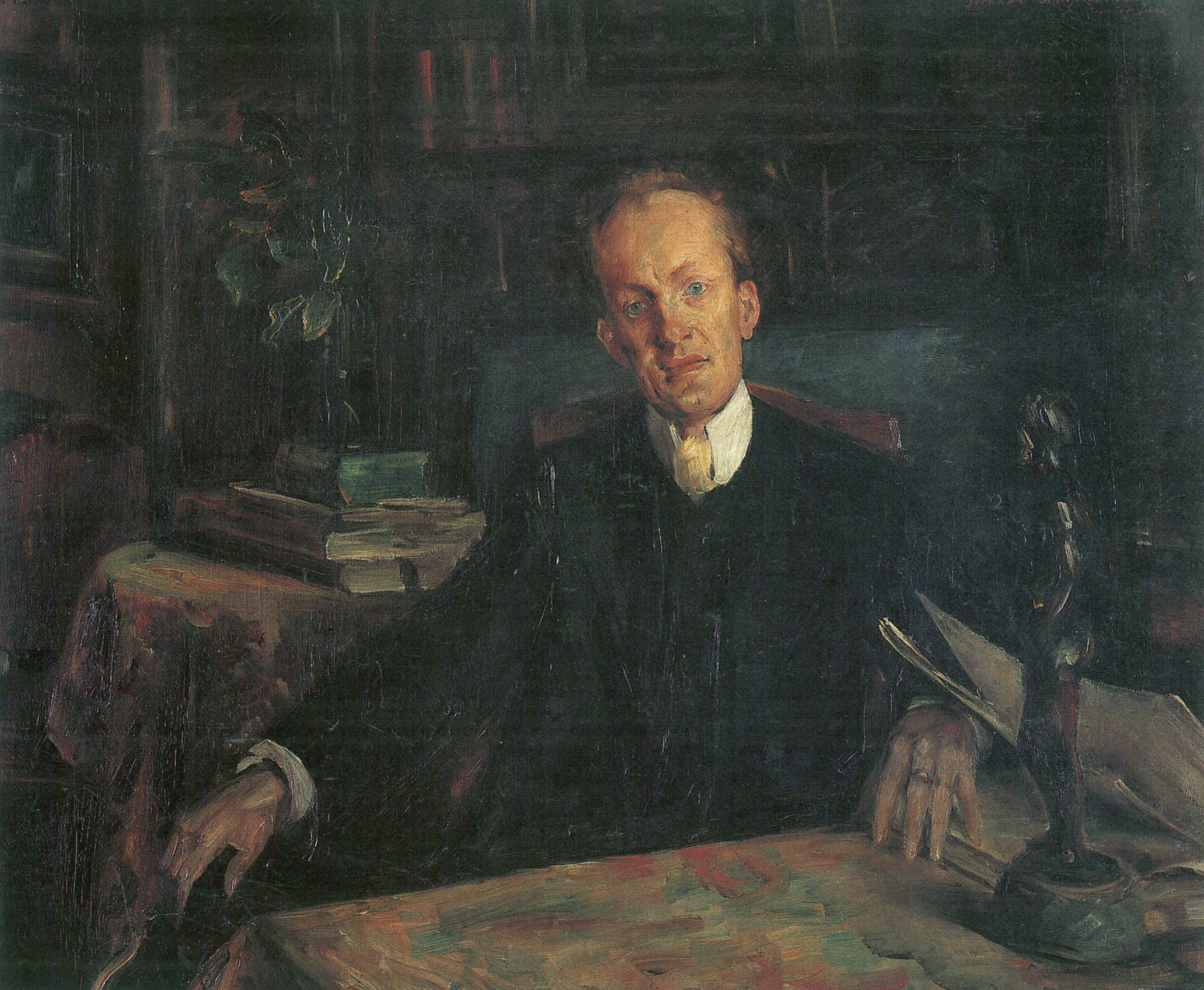
Porträt Gerhart Hauptmann, 1900

When Corinth's painting Salome was rejected for the Munich Secession exhibition in 1900, Corinth was disappointed and decided to go to Berlin. Leistikow asked him to make Salome available for the Berlin Secession exhibition, and it was a great success. In the fall of that year, he was given a solo exhibition at Paul Cassirer, and he was a regular guest of Gerhart Hauptmann. That year, he commuted regularly between Berlin and Munich and rented a provisional studio; in the fall of 1901, he moved to Berlin completely.

== Provenance and exhibitions ==
After its completion, the Portrait of Ohm Friedrich Corinth remained in the private possession of Lovis Corinth, from whose estate it passed into the possession of his family and later his daughter Wilhelmine Corinth, later Wilhelmine Corinth-Klopfer. It is possible that the painting was first in the possession of Charlotte Berend-Corinth, who brought it to New York before passing it on to her daughter. In 1987, the government of the Federal Republic of Germany bought the painting together with the painting Kuhstall directly from Wilhelmine Corinth-Klopfer for the Ostpreußisches Landesmuseum in Lüneburg (inventory number 8084/87, acqu. 1987).

The portrait was shown at numerous exhibitions, starting with the Berliner Secession exhibition in Berlin in 1913. In the same year, the painting was also shown at an art exhibition in Düsseldorf. In 1918, Corinth showed the painting again at the Berlin Secession and in 1923 at the Nationalgalerie there. Corinth died in 1925; in the following year, the portrait was exhibited at the Kunstverein Chemnitz, the Kunstverein Frankfurt, the Kunstverein Kassel, the Nassauischer Kunstverein in Wiesbaden and again at the Nationalgalerie. Further exhibitions with the portrait took place in 1927 at the Sächsischer Kunstverein in Dresden and in 1929 at the Neue Secession in Munich and at the Hagenbund in Vienna. In 1936, the Kunsthalle Basel showed the painting for the last time in German-speaking countries.

Between 1950 and 1952, the painting was part of a traveling exhibition of Corinth's works in numerous museums in the United States and Canada. In 1956 and 1958, the Volkswagen factory in Wolfsburg showed the painting again for the first time in Germany: as part of the exhibition German Painting and the memorial exhibition to celebrate the 100th anniversary of Corinth's birth. From 1958 to 1959, the Kunsthalle Basel, the Kunstverein Hannover and the Städtische Galerie München as well as the Tate Gallery in London organized commemorative exhibitions of the painting. In 1964 it was shown at the Gallery of Modern Art in New York, in 1967 at the Badischer Kunstverein in Karlsruhe, in 1976 at the Indianapolis Museum of Art and in 1979 at the Dixon Gallery in Memphis. In 1985 the painting was on display at the Museum Folkwang in Essen, before it passed into the possession of the East Prussian State Museum Lüneburg in 1987. In 1996 and 1997 it was part of a traveling exhibition at the Haus der Kunst in Munich, the National Gallery in Berlin, the Saint Louis Art Museum and the Tate Gallery. In 1999 it was exhibited at the Von der Heydt-Museum in Wuppertal as part of a Corinth exhibition and again in 2009 at the Österreichische Galerie Belvedere in Vienna.

== Literature ==
- Andrea Bärnreuther: Porträt des Ohm Friedrich Corinth. In: Peter-Klaus Schuster, Christoph Vitali, Barbara Butts (Hrsg.): Lovis Corinth. Prestel, München 1996, ISBN 3-7913-1645-1, p. 138–139.
- Charlotte Berend-Corinth: Lovis Corinth: Die Gemälde. Newly edited by Béatrice Hernad. Bruckmann publishing house, München 1992, ISBN 3-7654-2566-4, p. 83.
