= Carmencita (Corinth) =

Painting by Lovis Corinth

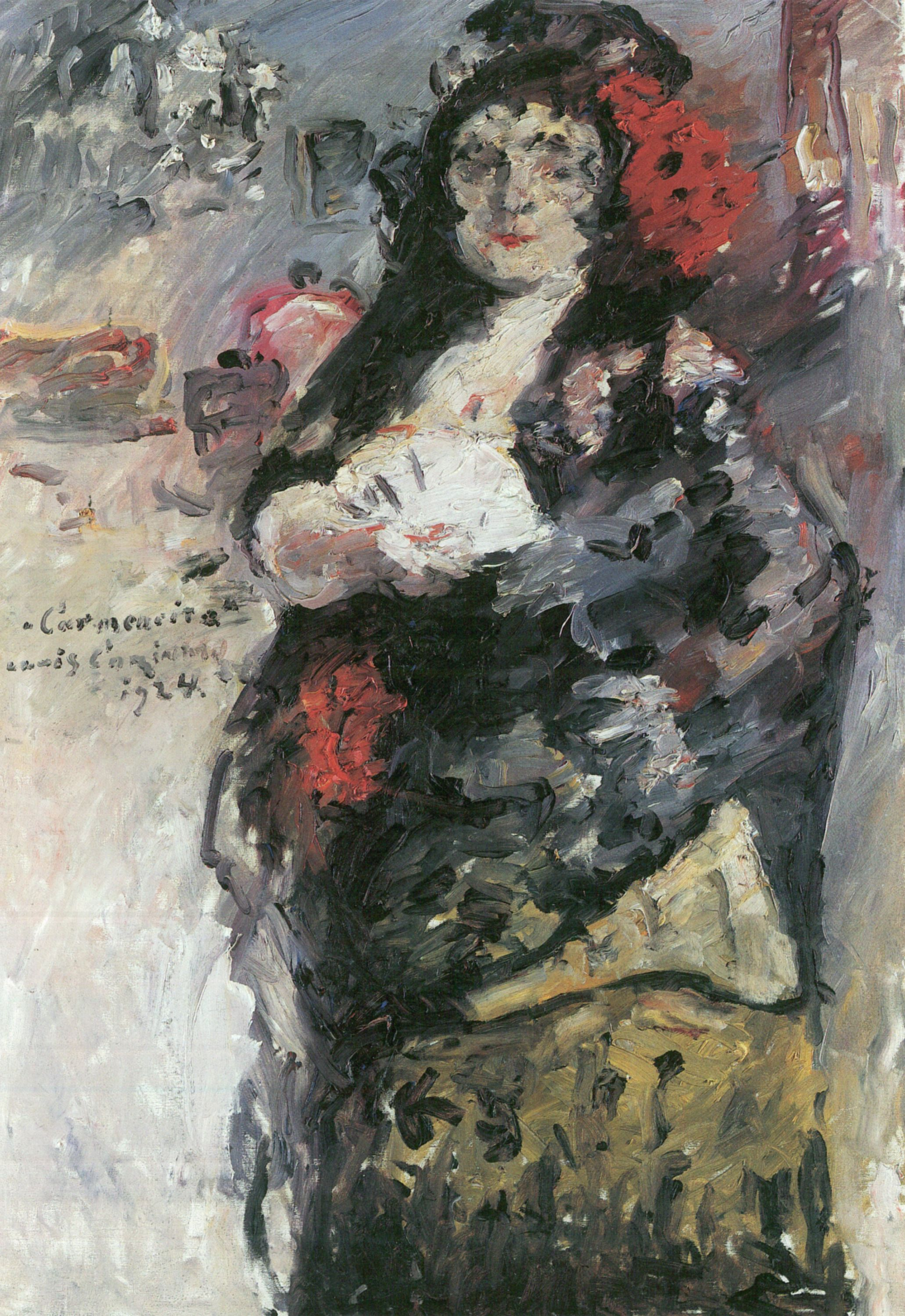
- Artist: Lovis Corinth
- Year: 1924
- Medium: Oil on canvas
- Dimensions: 130 cm × 90 cm (51 in × 35 in)
- Location: Städel, Frankfurt am Main

Carmencita is an oil on canvas painting by the German painter Lovis Corinth, from 1924. It belongs to his expressionist phase and it was the last portrait of his wife, Charlotte Berend-Corinth, who appears dressed as a Spanish noblewoman, after a costume party. It is held in the Städel, in Frankfurt am Main, which acquired it in 1959.

== History and description ==
The current painting was created shortly after a costume party that took place on February 28, 1924, at the Berlin Secession. Charlotte Berendt-Corinth wore the Spanish costume and accompanied her husband to this celebration in the family's private living room. With the help of a bright chandelier, an artificial festival atmosphere was created; and Georges Bizet's opera Carmen was played in the background to provide musical accompaniment to the scene. In a surviving photograph, Charlotte can be seen wearing the costume while posing for Corinth.

The painting shows Charlotte Berend-Corinth, then aged 44 years old, standing almost life-size in a three-quarter length portrait wearing a black costume. In the catalog raisonné of Corinth's paintings, Charlotte herself described it that way: “Charlotte Corinth in black lace over yellow silk, with red flowers in her hair. In the background there is a burning chandelier and furniture illuminated in bright red. Painted after a costume party in Berlin, Klopstockstrasse.”

The figure of the sitter is moved from the center of the painting to the right side, where, standing in the foreground, it takes up almost two thirds of the picture's width and its entire height. She is turned slightly to the right, but faces the viewer head-on. The face is surrounded by her dark hair, decorated with red flowers. The left arm is supported at the waist, and there is a red flower arrangement on the opposite side of her waist. The right arm lies bent in front of the chest, the hand holds a white fan and she uses it to cover the lower edge of the low-cut cleavage, which particularly emphasizes her chest. According to Andrea Bärnreuther, the opulence of her breasts appears to bulge out of the garment. Carl Georg Heise states that the depiction makes her appear “matronically strong, which in no way corresponds to external reality.”

At the background in the upper left corner is the named chandelier and a seating area made of light red furniture. Below the furniture the background is light, on the middle left edge the painting is dated of 1924 and signed with the words: "– Carmencita – / Lovis Corinth / 1924".

== Analysis ==
The coloring of the figure is very dominant in this work, while the motif is strongly resolved due to the quick and rough brushwork. The dominant color is the black of the costume and the hair, which covers the yellow-green of the silk dress and “burns into it like fire”. On the left arm, the black becomes transparent and allows her arm to be seen; here the colors change between black, blue, violet and dark red. Particularly striking are the red flowers in her hair and under her breast, “which pop out of the painting together with the red painted lips” (Andrea Bärnreuther), as well as the white emphasis on the breasts created by the fan and the cleavage.

== Provenance ==
The painting remained in the possession of Charlotte Berend-Corinth after her husband's death in 1925. When she moved to the United States, in 1939, it went as part of her art collection. In 1959, it was acquired by Ernst Holzinger for the Städel, in Frankfurt am Main, where it has been since then.
