= Innocence (Corinth) =

Painting by Lovis Corinth

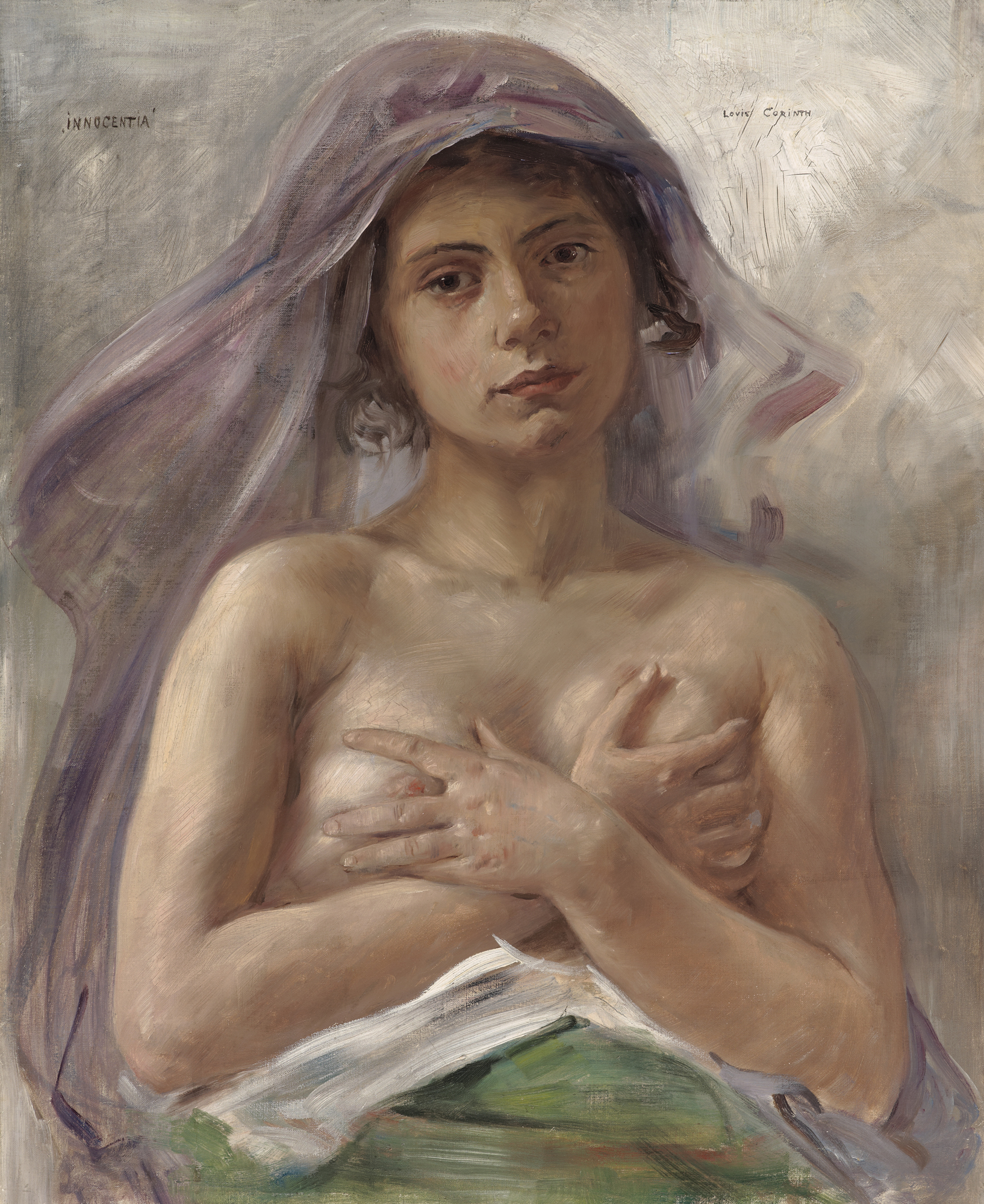
- Artist: Lovis Corinth
- Year: 1890
- Medium: Oil on canvas
- Dimensions: 66.5 cm × 54.5 cm (26.2 in × 21.5 in)
- Location: Städtische Galerie im Lenbachhaus, Munich

Innocence (German: Innocentia) is a painting created by the German painter Lovis Corinth in 1890. The picture depicts a semi-nude female and is owned by the Städtische Galerie im Lenbachhaus, in Munich.

== Picture description ==
The catalog raisonné of Corinth's paintings describes the artwork as a seminude depiction of a young girl adorned with a purple veil. In the painting, the girl is shown in a frontal view with her upper body exposed, crossing her arms in front of her chest to partially cover her breasts with her hands. A white and olive-green garment resembling a stripped-down white-lined olive-green dress covers her belly below the arms. The composition reveals the right nipple between the middle and index fingers of her left hand.

The girl's head is slightly angled, and she wears a violet cloth as a veil, that hangs down behind her right shoulder and thus forms the background of her body. Her expressions appear melancholic and absently dreamy, conveying a sense of absent-mindedness.

The background of the painting is predominantly white and gray-white. The upper left corner of the picture bears the inscription ‘Innocentia’ without a specific year, while the artist’s signature, ‘Lovis Corinth,’ is in the upper right corner.

== Interpretation ==
According to Andrea Bärnreuther (1996), the grasp of the hands in the painting signifies the woman’s self-awareness of her physicality as a woman. She interprets this gesture as a translation of the "gesture of humility familiar from depictions of figures like Mary and the Magdalene into the language of naturalism, giving it a motivation as a gesture of the psycho-physical self." In 2008, Andreas Dehmer also compares the painting to religious depictions of figures such as the Vestal virgin, Mary, or the penitent Mary Magdalene. Dehmer highlights the significance of the painting’s title, which suggests themes of chastity and innocence.

Raphael: "La Fornarina", 1518–1519

However, according to Dehmer's perspective, the portrayal of 'Innocentia' is simply a superficial representation of innocence. He highlights the contradiction presented in the deliberate display of the nipple, which evokes associations with paintings of courtesans such as Raphael's Fornarina from 1520. He references the concept of the "saint and whore" dichotomy. Dehmer suggests that Corinth may have drawn inspiration from the Dutch Baroque paintings that featured similar imagery, such as the painting Monk and Beguine by Cornelis van Haarlem, displayed in the Haarlem Museum. In these Dutch Baroque works, a nun’s nipple is pressed to stimulate the flow of milk to verify suspicions of pregnancy. Dehmer speculates that Corinth may have incorporated elements of this iconography into his own painting.

Andrea Bärnreuther refers to the concept of "the literal incarnation brought before the eyes, which plays with the transient nature of the erotic through the dialectic of veiling and unveiling." Dehmer also acknowledges this interplay, further emphasized by the presence of the veil in works like the Donna velata (veiled woman).

== Origin, exhibitions, and provenance ==
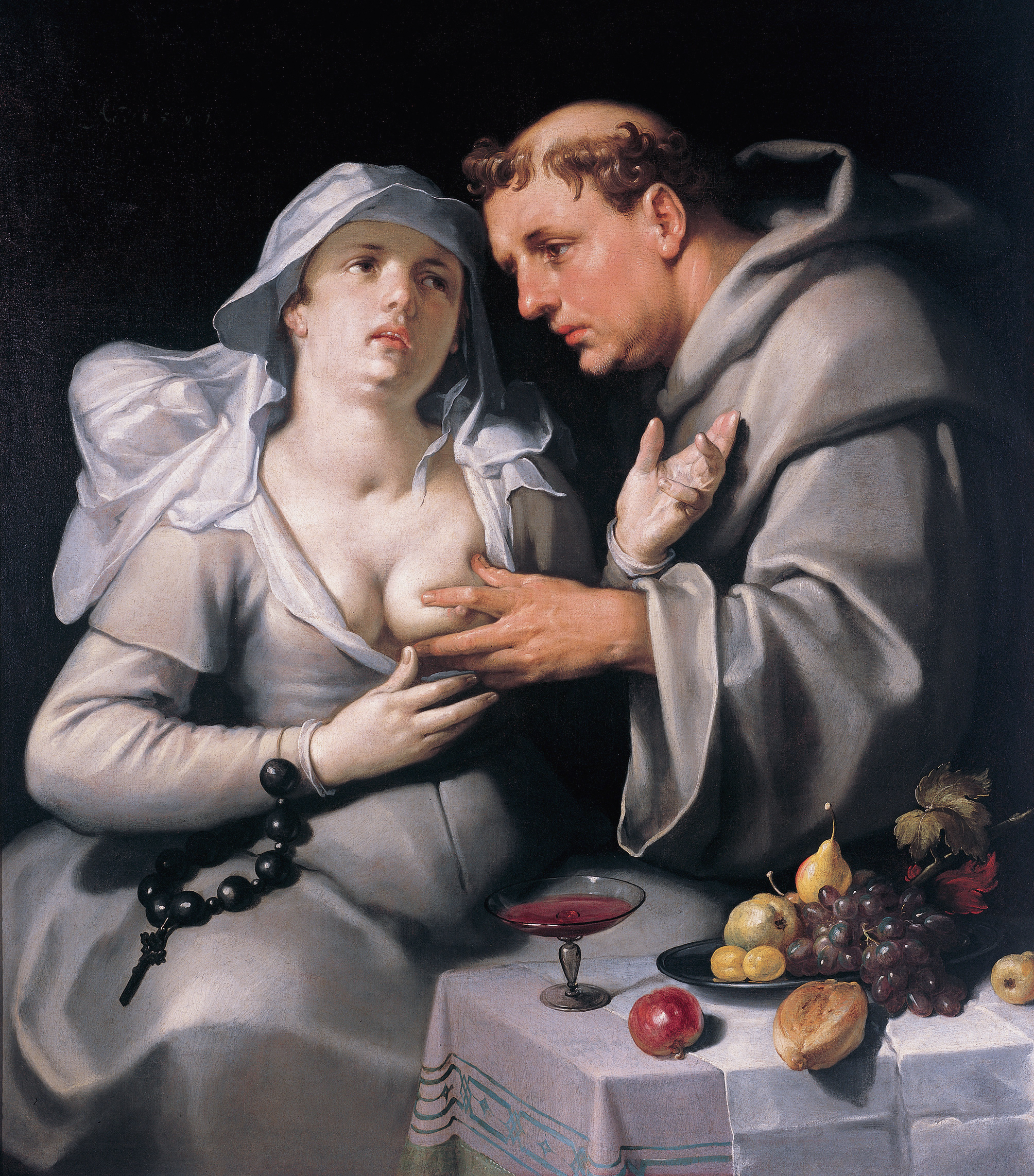
Cornelis van Haarlem: Monk and Begine, 1591

Only limited information is available regarding the origin of the painting. In Charlotte Berend-Corinth's catalog raisonné, the artwork is mentioned solely in the revised 2nd edition supplement (BC 998), with its absence noted in the first edition.

The painting remained in private ownership until it was eventually acquired by the Städtische Galerie im Lenbachhaus. It was publicly exhibited for the first time at the Lenbachhaus in 1975. Subsequently, the artwork was showcased at the Folkwang Museum in Essen and the Kunsthaus der Hypo-Kulturstiftung in Munich showed the picture in 1985/86. It was also featured in exhibitions at the Kunstforum Vienna in 1992 and at the Niedersächsisches Landesmuseum in Hanover from 1992 to 1993. Further exhibitions took place in 1996 at the Alte Nationalgalerie in Berlin and as part of a retrospective exhibition commemorating the artist's 150th birthday in 2008, held at the Musée d'Orsay in Paris, the Museum der bildenden Künste in Leipzig and the Kunstforum Ostdeutsche Galerie in Regensburg.
