= Young Woman with Cats =

Painting by Lovis Corinth

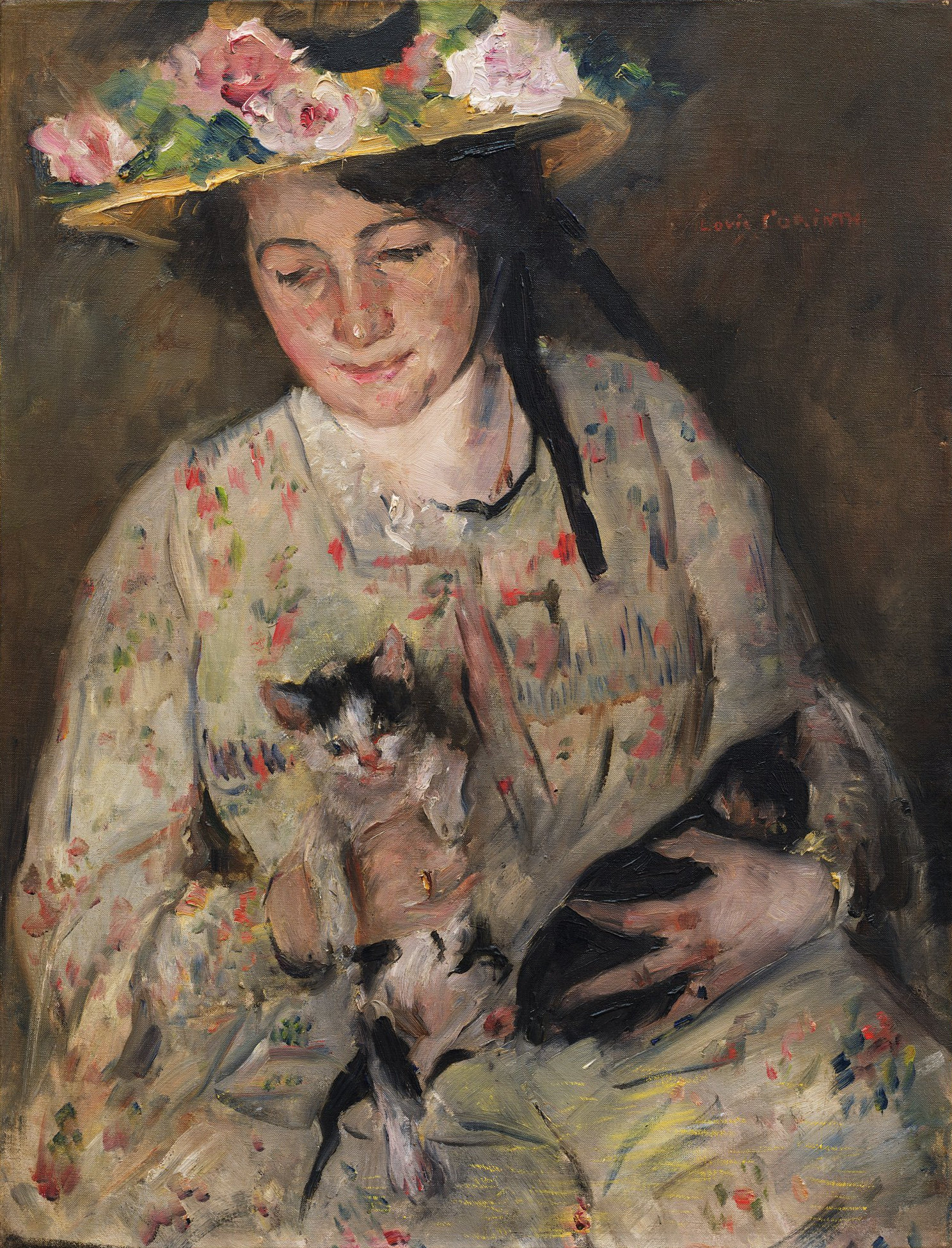
- Artist: Lovis Corinth
- Year: 1904
- Medium: Oil on canvas
- Dimensions: 78.5 cm × 60 cm (30.9 in × 24 in)
- Location: Staatsgalerie Stuttgart; Stuttgart

Young Woman with Cats is an oil on canvas painting by the German painter Lovis Corinth, from 1904. The person portrayed is Corinth's wife, Charlotte Berend, who was 24 years old at the time. The painter's signature can be found in the upper right corner of the canvas. It is held now in the Staatsgalerie Stuttgart.

== Description ==
Charlotte Berend was portrayed several times by Corinth. Here he depicts his wife, who was 23 years his junior, wearing a floral dress and a hat decorated with flowers. The subject of the painting and the way in which color is handled is reminiscent of early French Impressionism. Although Lovis Corinth is sometimes considered an Impressionist, the portrait is more direct and clearly articulated than similar paintings by French Impressionists. The painting radiates intimacy with the person portrayed. The youth and innocence of the woman is underlined by the two kittens that she holds in her hands.

== The subject ==
Charlotte Berend was a painter and was the first student to take lessons from Lovis Corinth, in 1901, who had founded a private “painting school for women” and for whom she would be regularly available as a model since 1902. The following year, on March 26, 1903, Lovis Corinth and Charlotte Berend got married, and she adopted the double name Berend-Corinth. They had two children, Thomas (born in 1904), and Wilhelmine Corinth (born in 1909).

Charlotte Berend-Corinth painted in a similar style to her husband and was a member of the Berlin Secession. She is remembered nowadays mostly because she was the editor of his husband's catalog raisonné.
