= Self-Portrait with Skeleton =

Painting by Lovis Corinth

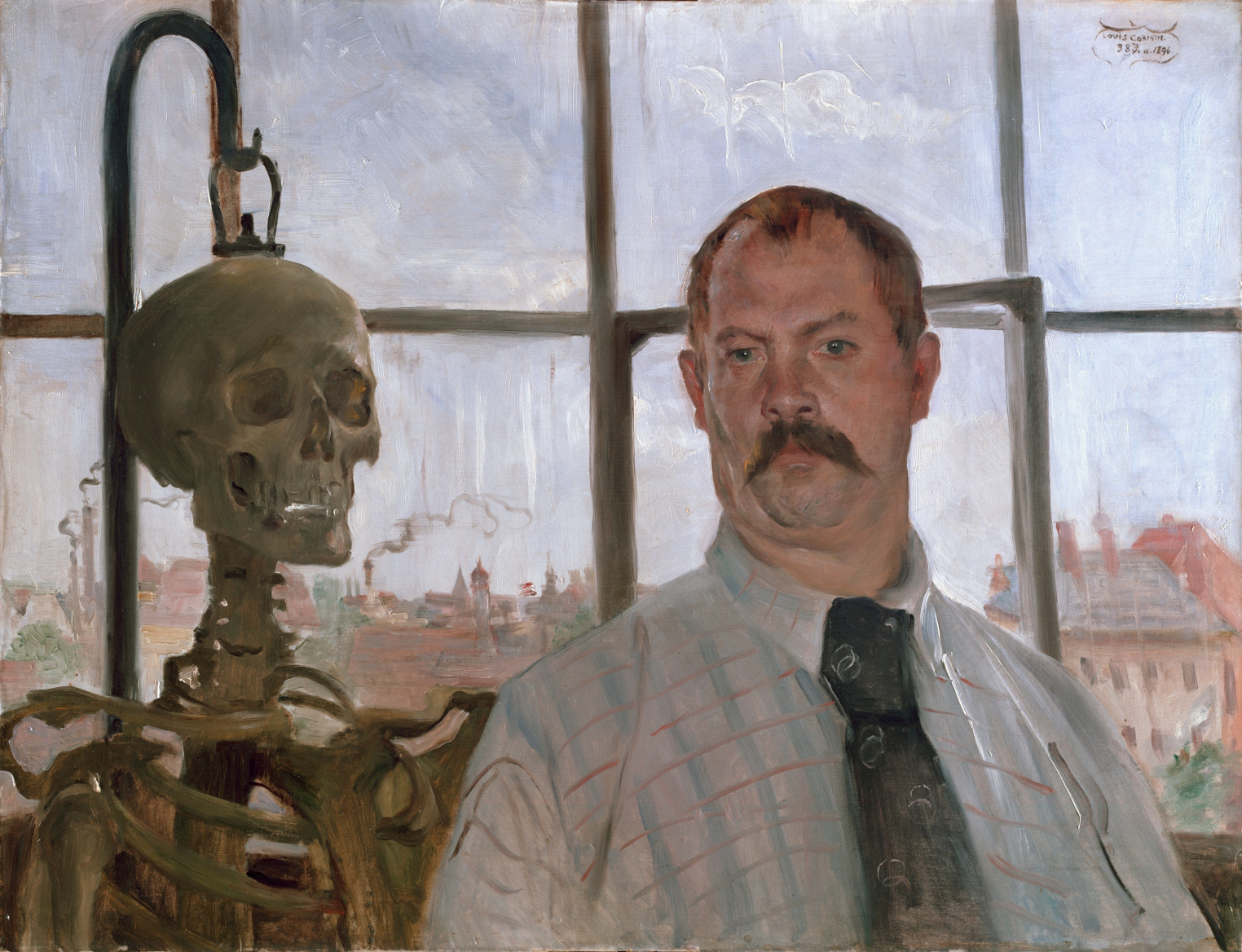
- Artist: Lovis Corinth
- Year: 1896
- Medium: Oil on canvas
- Dimensions: 68 cm × 88 cm (27 in × 35 in)
- Location: Lenbachhaus, Munich

Self-Portrait with Skeleton is an oil on canvas painting by the German painter Lovis Corinth, from 1896. It is held in the Lenbachhaus, in Munich.

== Description ==
The painting depicts Corinth and the skeleton as the two protagonists: they are near each other, with the panorama of the city of Munich in the background, seen through the wide studio window. The painting cuts off the bodies at chest height and therefore only shows their upper parts. According to Charlotte Berend-Corinth's catalog raisonné, the canvas depicts “Corinth in front of a large studio window, in a pale blue checked shirt."

The painter presents himself in a realistic way, with little or any idealization. He wears a mustache and short, dark hair, marked by a receding hairline, as well as a light-colored checkered shirt with a dark tie. The skeleton is suspended from a pole with a bracket in the skull and is slightly lower than the artist. A studio window in the background illuminates the scene and places the two figures in backlight. The window runs across the entire width of the painting and consists of small fields, of which two rows of four fields each are partially visible. One of these metal-framed windows is open. This pane, which opens into the room towards the viewer, is located directly behind Corinth and thus visually moves him forward. The metal frames of the window panes form two crosses that can be seen to the right and left of Corinth. A third window cross is hidden by the skeleton. The window offers a view of a white-gray sky. In the lower half of the lower row of windows, buildings, roofs and church towers can be seen in an ocher tone. The smoking chimneys indicate industry.

Corinth's signature can be found on the upper right edge of the picture in fine letters and is therefore actually very untypical for him. In a cartouche he wrote in German: Lovis Corinth./ 38 J. a. 1896. (English: Lovis Corinth./ 38 years old 1896.) The “J.” stands and indicates its age, the “a.” for anno and indicates the year. This signature is interpreted as a reference to the frontal Self-Portrait of Albrecht Dürer (c. 1500) who served as a model.

== Influences and interpretation ==
Corinth is believed to have painted the Self-Portrait with Skeleton in response to the Self-Portrait with Death Playing the Fiddle (1872), by the Swiss painter Arnold Böcklin, who was widely admired back then in Germany. Böcklin depicted the skeleton in his work as a live figure, he plays the violin while the artist listens to it. He wanted to illustrate the fact that life is finite, similarly to a Memento mori, and at the same time, death served as his muse. In this context, he was quoting motifs that had been used frequently in visual arts since the Middle Ages. Hans Thoma also adopted the motif of the skeleton as a muse in his Self-Portrait (1875). Here a skull decorated with a laurel wreath looks over the artist's shoulder and above his head, in the branches of a tree, sits the god Cupid.

Corinth took the motif of the skeleton but placed it in a completely new context. He presents a skeleton, as was normally used back then as a teaching model for anatomical demonstrations in medicine, lifeless and in the form of an object that had been stripped of all threat and symbolic power. The skeleton as a utensil can only be kept upright by hanging it on an iron stand. The connection to reality is reinforced by the real depiction of a big city with smoking chimneys that enters through the window into the brightly lit room. By depicting himself with the skeleton, the artist shows the clear and natural limitation of life through death, in which there is no mysticism.

The current work is one of the most famous of his numerous self-portraits. This painting was created when he was not yet at the peak of his popularity, and before his important move from Munich to Berlin. In the same year, he also created View from the Munich-Schwabing Studio, which shows a thematic connection with this self-portrait, through the depiction of the view from his studio window.

== Context ==
Corinth had been painting self-portraits regularly since 1886, but the skeleton does not appear in any other of them. He would return to the motif of the hanging skeleton depicted with him, twenty years later, and five years after his stroke, in 1916, in The Artist and Death. This time, there isn't a studio window visible, but instead, as a darker metaphore, a goat skull in the form of a trophy that hangs on the wall at the background.

In his later graphics and drawings, created after the German defeat at World War I, in 1918, death in the form of a skull appears very often. He gives death a threatening symbolism, which is missing in this painting. This is particularly impressive in the portfolio with six drypoint etchings, published under the name The Danse Macabre, in 1921. In all six pictures, the people depicted are confronted with death in the form of a skull.

== Provenance ==
The painting had been in the possession of Dr. A. Ulrich, since 1899. It was later sold by him to the Städtische Galerie im Lenbachhaus, in Munich.
