= Eva Stort =

German artist

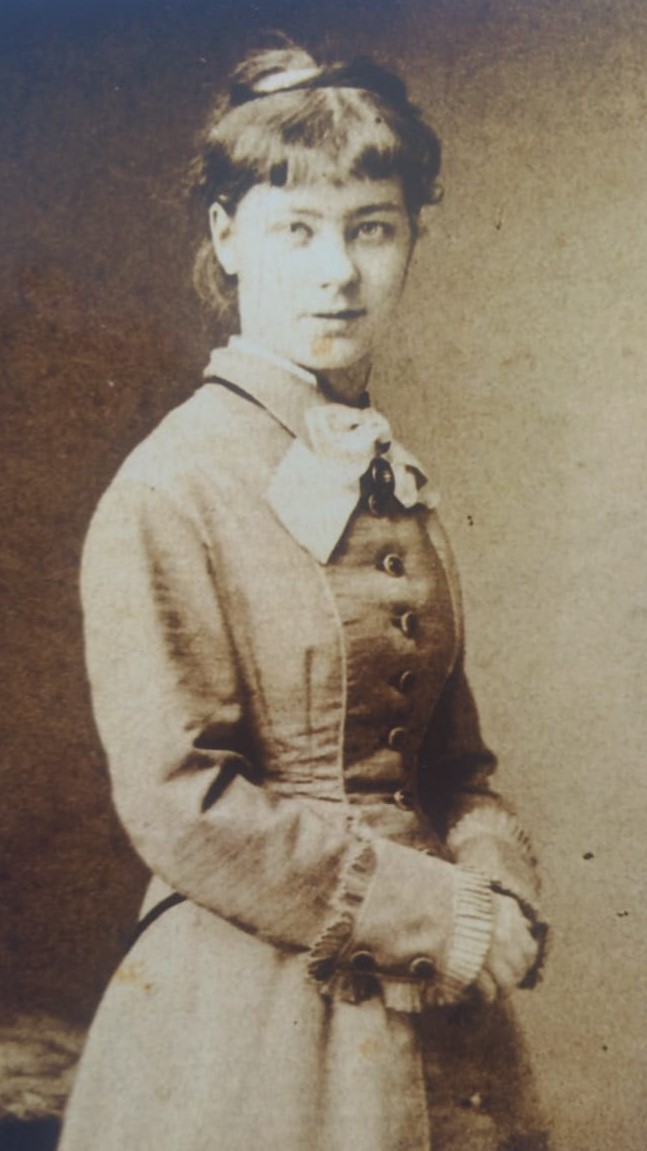
- Born: 1 February 1855; Berlin, Germany
- Died: 31 January 1936 (aged 80); Berlin, Germany
- Known for: Painting

Eva Stort (1855-1936) was a German painter.

== Biography ==
Stort was born on 1 February 1855 in Berlin, Germany. She studied at the Kunstgewerbemuseum Berlin. Her teachers included Karl Stauffer-Bern and Max Liebermann. She was a member of Verein der Berliner Künstlerinnen (Association of Women Artists in Berlin). Her work was included in the exhibitions of the Berlin Secession.

She died on 31 January 1936 in Berlin. Her work is in the collection of the Staatsgalerie Stuttgart.

== Gallery ==
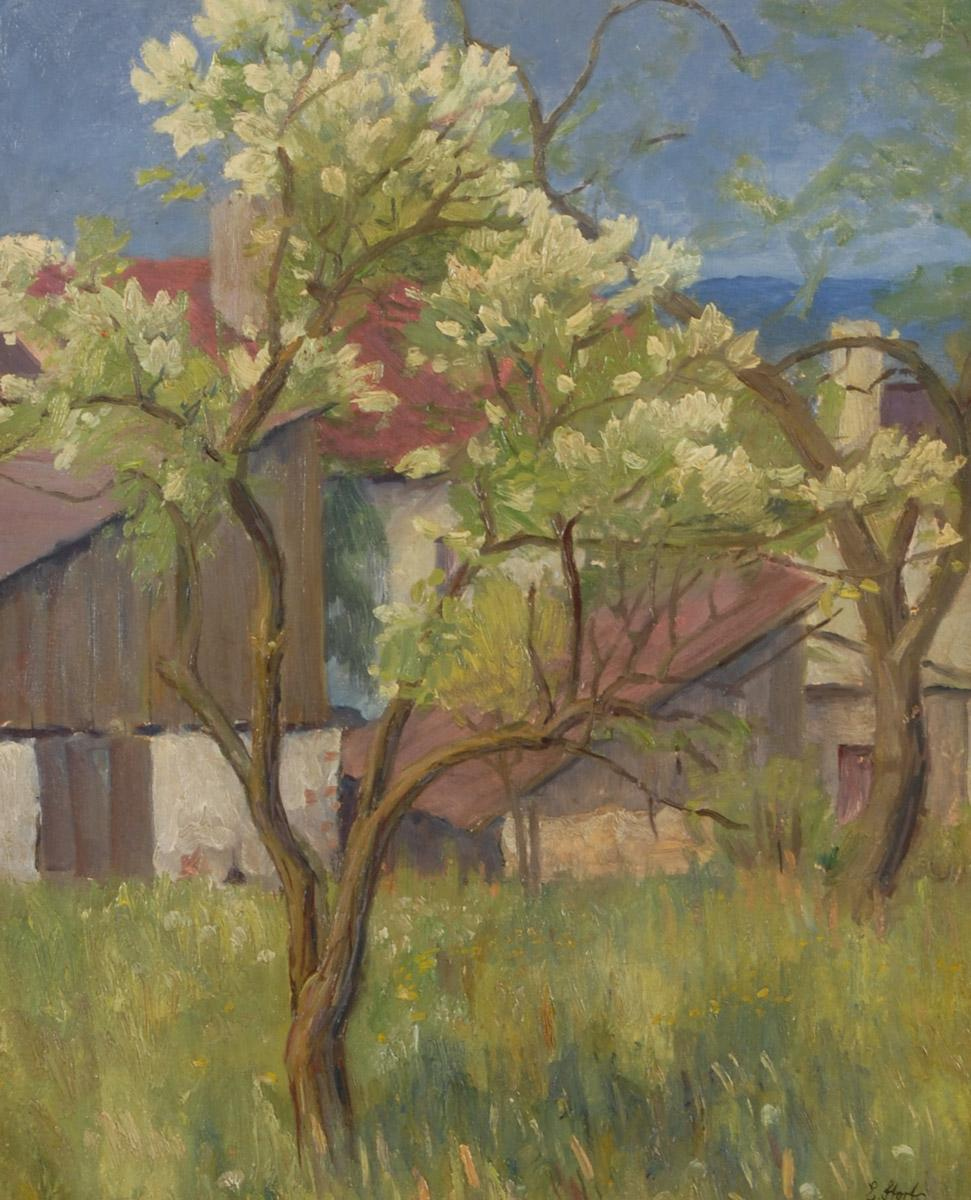
Frühlingsbäume

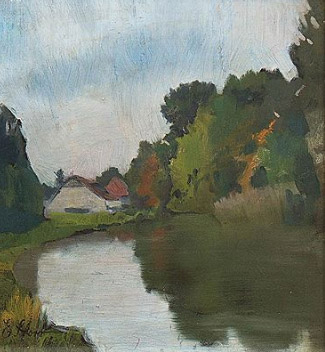
Haus am Badden
