= East Prussian Regional Museum =

Coordinates: 53°14′46.3″N 10°24′26.8″E

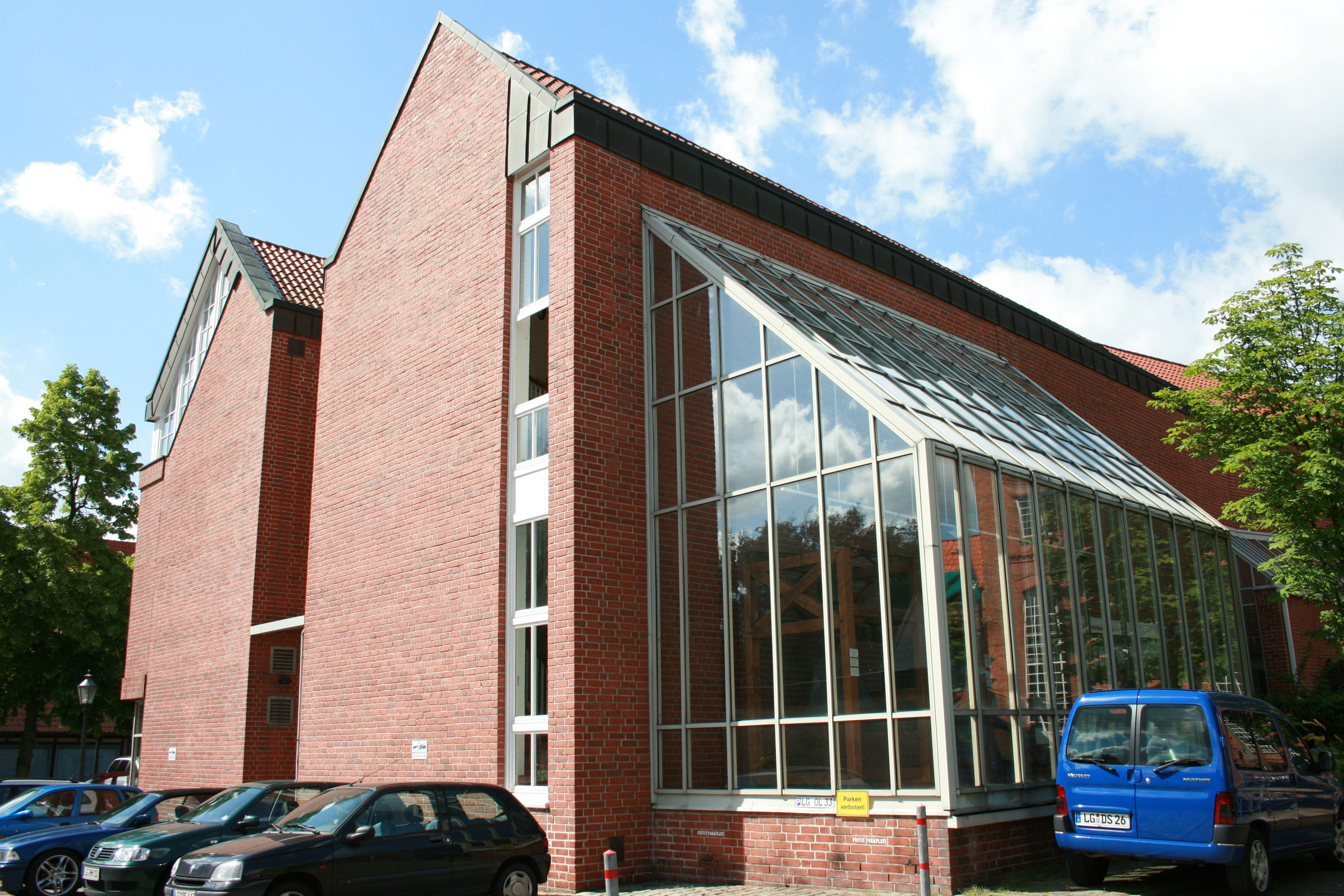
East Prussian Regional Museum

The East Prussian Regional Museum (German: Ostpreußisches Landesmuseum), with a Baltic German department, in Lüneburg, Lower Saxony in Germany, was established in 1987 on the basis of the East Prussian Hunting Museum (German: Ostpreußischen Jagdmuseum) created by forester Hans Loeffke. It documents and commemorates the history, art and culture, landscape and fauna of the former German province of East Prussia. Since spring 2009 the director of the museum has been the historian Dr. Joachim Mähnert.
