= Charlotte Berend-Corinth =

German painter

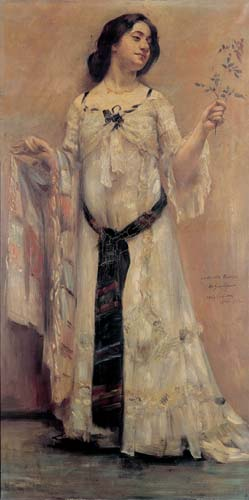
Portrait of Charlotte Berend in a White Dress (1902), by Lovis Corinth, oil on canvas, Stadtmuseum, Berlin

Charlotte Berend-Corinth (25 May 1880 – 10 January 1967) was a German Jewish painter and artist in the Berliner Secession. She was married to German painter Lovis Corinth.

== Life ==
Charlotte Berend studied fine arts at the Royal School of Art in Berlin and the Berliner Kunstgewerbemuseum, taught by Eva Stort and Max Schäfer. In 1901, she was the first student at the private art school of Lovis Corinth, who fell in love with her. She became his model for a number of paintings, including Portrait of Charlotte Berend in a White Dress (seen at right). On 26 March 1903, she married Corinth and changed her name to Berend-Corinth. On 13 October the same year their son Thomas Corinth was born, and their daughter Wilhelmine Corinth was born on 13 June 1909.

Berend-Corinth began exhibiting her paintings at the Berliner Secession in 1906. She joined the Secession in 1912 and did not leave it after the separation of the new Freie Secession led by Max Liebermann when Lovis Corinth became its new leader. She painted book illustrations for Max Pallenberg, Fritzi Massary, and Valeska Gert and painted portraits of Michael Bohnen, Werner Krauss, Paul Bildt and Paul Graetz. In the 1920s, she supported young artists from the theatres in Berlin. In 1919 Lovis Corinth bought a house in Urfeld at Walchensee where he and his wife could retire from their life in Berlin. It was here, in her lakeside home at Urfeld, where she painted landscapes, portraits and still lifes and more and more retired from the active arts scene. Her husband died in 1925 from pneumonia during a journey to the Netherlands. Her work was part of the painting event in the art competition at the 1932 Summer Olympics.

Berend-Corinth emigrated in 1933 to the United States of America, where her son Thomas was already living in New York City. In 1958, she published a book of the complete paintings of Lovis Corinth, which became a standard work and is in use today in a 1992 edition from Béatrice Hernad.

Berend-Corinth died in 1967.

== See also ==
- List of German painters

== Sources ==
- Pfefferkorn, Rudolf (1972). Die Berliner Secession. Eine Epoche deutscher Kunstgeschichte. Berlin: Haude & Spenersche Verlagsbuchhandlung
- Corinth, L., Schuster, P.-K., Vitali, C., & Butts, B. (1996). Lovis Corinth. Munich: Prestel. ISBN 3-7913-1682-6
