= Lovi =

Lovi may refer to:

- George Lovi (1939–1993), Hungarian-American astronomical cartographer
- 5943 Lovi a main-belt asteroid, named after George Lovi
- Lovi Poe (born 1989), a Filipino actress and model
- Lõvi, Estonian surname

== See also ==
- Lovie (name)
- Lovin (surname)
- Lovis (name)
- Lovisa (given name)
- Lavi (disambiguation)
- Levi (disambiguation)
