= Lovis =

Lovis can be a given name and a surname:

Given name

- Lovis Corinth (1858-1925), German painter
- Lovis H. Lorenz (1898-1976), German publisher, writer and journalist

Surname

- Christophe Lovis, Swiss astronomer
- François Lovis (1817–1890), Swiss architect

== See also ==
- Lovi (disambiguation)
- Lovisa (given name)
