= Lovie =

Lovie is a given name, nickname and surname. People so named include:

- Lovie Austin (1887–1972), American female bandleader, piano player, composer and arranger
- Lovie Gore (1904-1980), American politician
- Lovie Smith (born May 8, 1958), National Football League head coach
- Lovie Yancey (1912–2008), founder of the Fatburger restaurant chain
- Jim Lovie (born 1932), Scottish former footballer
- William James Lovie (1868–1938), Canadian farmer and politician
- Lovie Lee (1909–1997), American electric blues pianist and singer born Edward Lee Watson
- Lovie Awards, European sister award program to the Webby Awards launched in 2010

== See also ==
- Lovieanne Jung (born 1980), American retired softball player
- Lovi (disambiguation)
- Lovey (disambiguation)
