= Lovey =

Lovey or Lővey may refer to:

== Music ==
- Lovey, nickname of American roadie Ben Dorcy
- Lovey (singer), South Korean singer-songwriter
- Lovey (album), an album by the Lemonheads

== Other uses ==
- Lovey Howell, a television character
- Mária Lővey, Hungarian gymnast

== See also ==
- Loveys (surname)
- Lovie (name)
