= Loveys =

Loveys is a surname. Notable people with the surname include:

- Ralph A. Loveys (1929–2017), American politician
- Walter Loveys (1920–1969), British farmer and politician

== See also ==
- Lovey (disambiguation)
