= Doramaria Purschian =

German painter

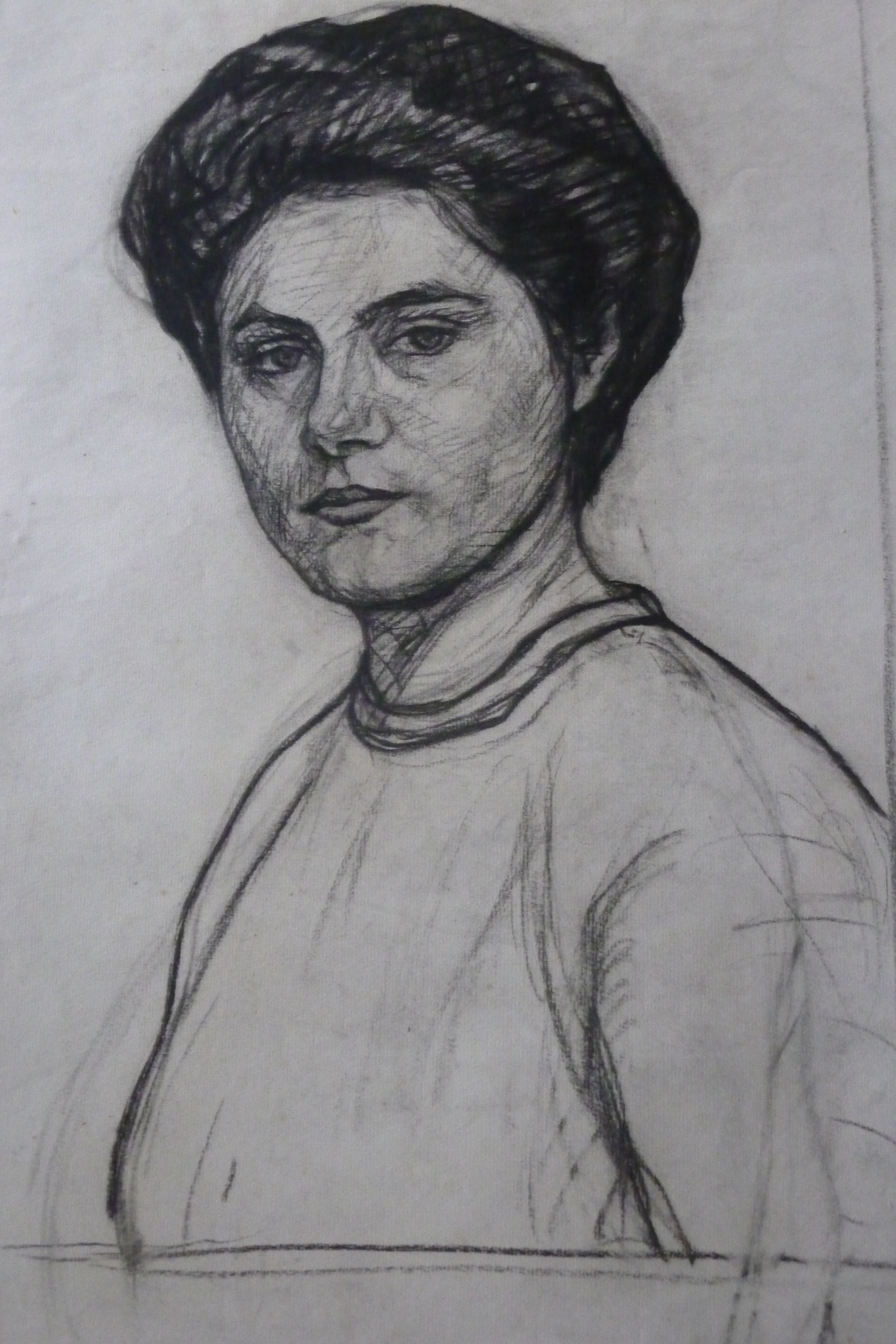
- Self portrait, 1909
- Born: Ella Margaretha Maria Dora Purschian; 6 July 1890; Berlin
- Died: 11 July 1972 (aged 82); Berlin
- Education: Royal School of Art, Berlin
- Known for: Expressionist landscapes, still lifes, and portraits
- Style: Expressionism
- Parents: Ernst Purschian (father); Gabriela Purschian (mother)
- Awards: Honorary member of the Academy of Arts in Rome

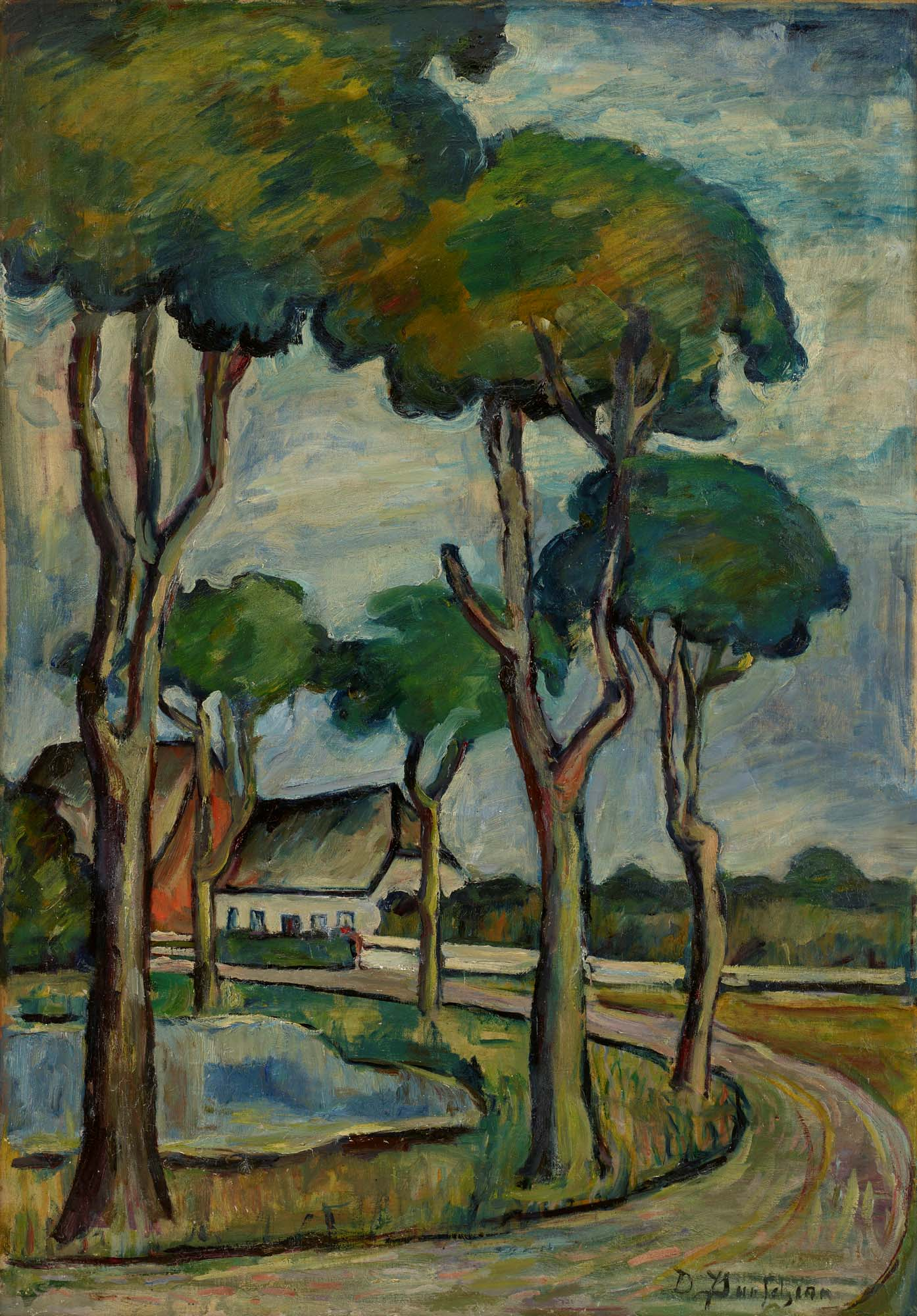
Woods with Farmhouse 1908.

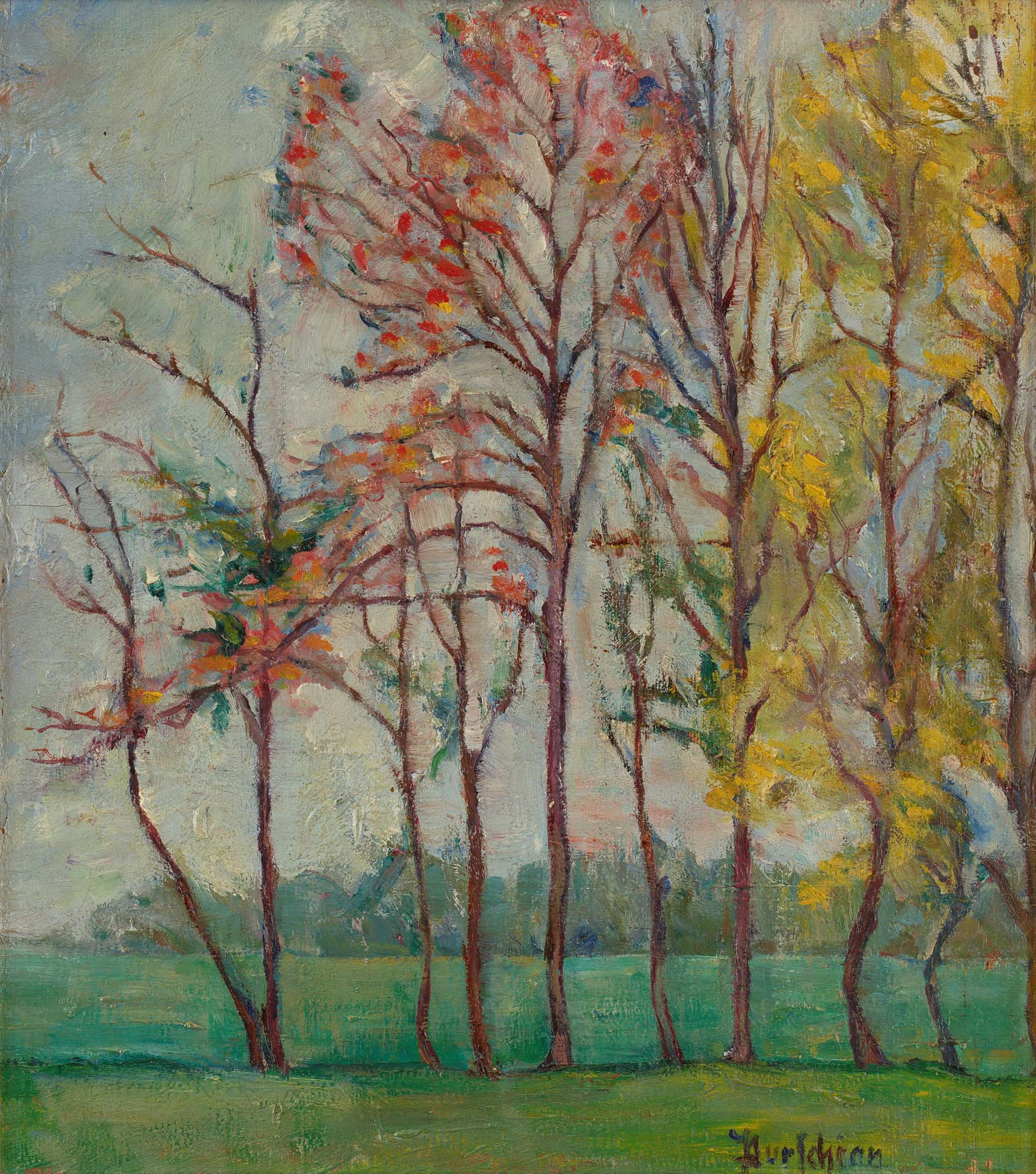
Spring Flowers, 1919

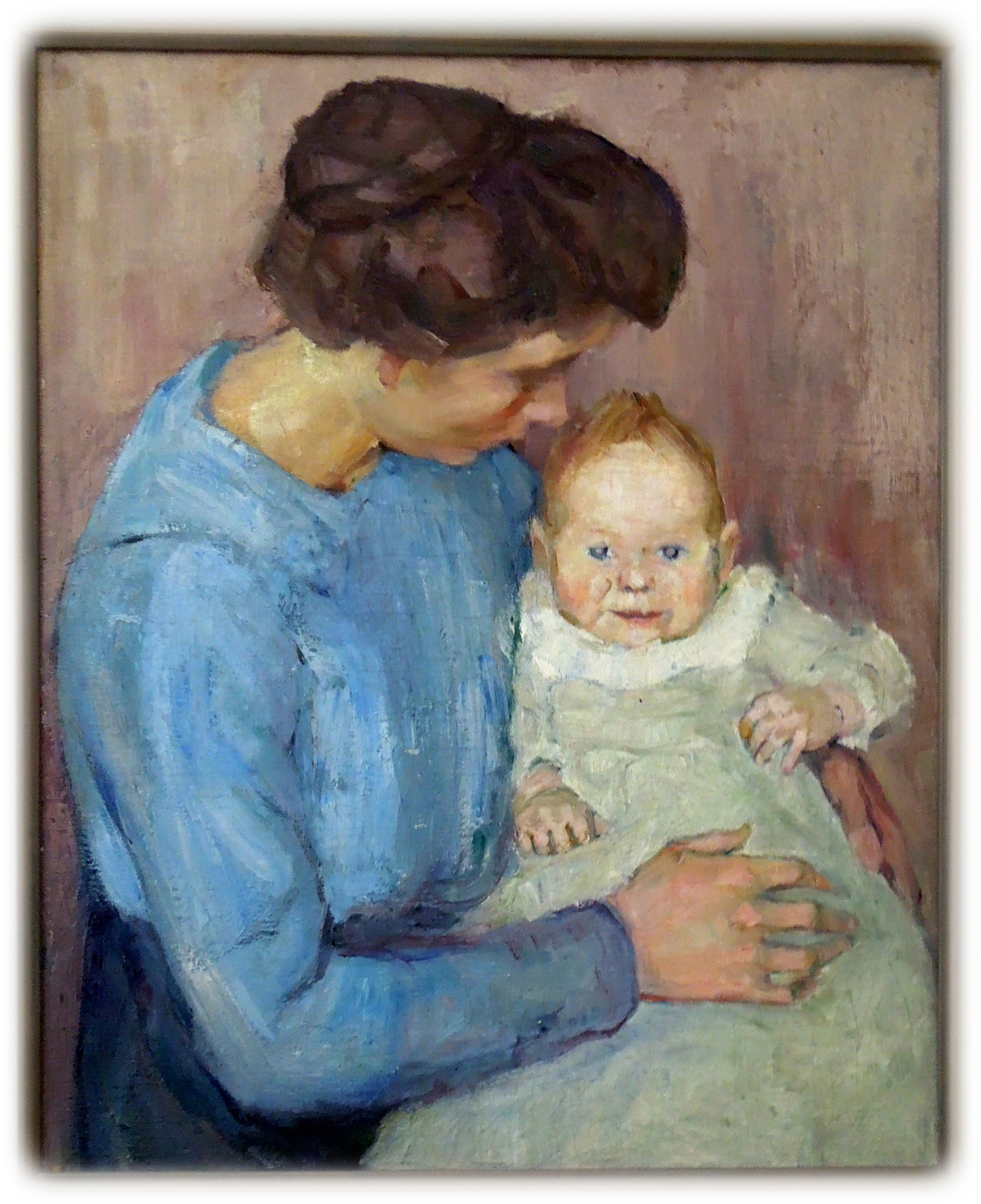
Mother and Child, 1925

Doramaria Purschian (6 July 1890 – 11 July 1972) was a German artist known for her Expressionist landscapes, still lifes, and portraits.

== Early life and education ==
She was born Ella Margaretha Maria Dora Purschian in Berlin, the daughter of Ernst Purschian, an engineer, and Gabriela Purschian. She studied art at the Royal School of Art in Berlin, becoming one of the first women to complete an apprenticeship in the fine arts (the school did not admit women as full students until 1919). In 1909, she passed an exam to become a drawing teacher, but continued studying for several more years as a student of Lovis Corinth and Fritz Bürger.

During World War I, she served as a Red Cross nurse.

== Art career ==
Following the war, she pursued an independent career as a painter until 1930, specializing in portraits. She also made drawings and at least one etching. When her brother Frank died in 1939, she took over management of his company.

In 1949, during the Berlin Blockade, she was the victim of a brutal robbery by the Gladow gang led by Werner Gladow. She never entirely recovered her health after this.

After World War II, her work was exhibited more widely and consistently. She earned an honorable mention at the 2nd Exhibition of European Painters in the United States (1969) and was appointed an honorary member of the Academy of Arts in Rome.

She died in Berlin in 1972 and later on a solo exhibition was mounted in Berlin in 1981.

== Sources ==
This page is in part a translation from de:Doramaria Purschian. Sources listed on that page include:

- Reichskammer der bildenden Künste - Landesleitung Berlin. Landesarchiv Berlin A Rep. 243–04, p. 306.
- Käthe, Paula und der ganze Rest. Künstlerinnenlexikon. Berlin: Verein der Berliner Künstlerinnen, 1992, p. 132. ISBN 3891814119.
- Katalog zur Ausstellung "Fortsetzung folgt! 150 Jahre Verein der Berliner Künstlerinnen". Berlin: Vice Versa Verlag, 2017, pp. 120–21. ISBN 978-3-932809-81-1.
