= Fritz Goldschmidt =

German Jewish businessman and art collector

Fritz Goldschmidt (19 December 1871 – 1944) was a German Jewish businessman and art collector, plundered and murdered in the Holocaust.

== Life until 1933 ==
Fritz Jonah Goldschmidt was born on 19 December 1871 in Breslau, Silesia, Germany. He co-founded the Koppenheim & Goldschmidt grain company in 1898 together Meyer Koppenheim (1866-1940). Goldschmidt was a commodities broker, an arbitration judge and temporary president of the Breslau Product Exchange. The Goldschmidts were important members of Wroclaw society, financing a Jewish hospital, raising funds for a local Jewish school and founding a Jewish museum together with other local Jewish art collectors. They collected art, and displayed many German modernists in their villa on Kommendeweg and often provided loans for exhibitions throughout Germany.

Goldschmidt married Thea Rivka Cohn (1888-1944), an art lover who, together with her husband, appreciated and collected Max Liebermann, Max Slevogt, Lovis Corinth, Wilhelm Trübner, Hans Purmann and of sculptures by August Gaul, as well as works by French artists: Lucien Andrion, Maurice de Vlamick, Eduard Vuillard and Maximilien Luce and. They also collected drawings and engravings. Many artworks had been purchased by the Goldschmidts in the Berliner Paul Cassirer Salon. The Goldschmidts loaned works to exhibitions, like the 1920 Silesian Association of Artists (Künstlerbund Schlesien).

== Nazi era ==
When Adolf Hitler came to power in Germany in 1933, the Goldschmidts were persecuted under Nazi anti-Jewish laws. Goldschmidt was forced to resign from his position as president of Schlesische Getreide-Kreditbank AG. In accordance with the Nazi race laws, his businesses were "aryanized", that is forceably transferred to non-Jewish owners.. The Goldschmidts' three sons were expelled from Germany and fled to safety in the United States, the United Kingdom and then in British-controlled Palestine.

In 1936, his wife, Thea, sold nine sculptures from Auguste Gaul's series "Der kleine Tierpark" through the Paul Graupe auction house in Berlin. A small group of paintings were sent with the Goldschmidt sons and some family friends who had also fled the country, but a large part of their collection remained in Breslau. In 1937, the Goldschmidts were forced to move out of the villa on Kommendeweg into smaller accommodation at Kaiser-Wilhelm-Straße 186. Fritz was arrested by the Gestapo on Kristallnacht, the Nazi's massive anti-Jewish pogrom, in the night of November 9, 1938, but was released the next day, most likely due to his high position in the Breslau Commodity Exchange. His art collection, like all Jewish art collections in the German Reich under Nazi rule, was targeted. Their assets were seized or auctioned off.

In 1943 the Nazis deported the Goldschmidts to Theresienstadt concentration camp, and then to the Auschwitz extermination camp, where they were murdered in 1944. Fritz was 72 and Thea was 56.

== Postwar ==
In 2015 surviving family members made a restitution claim for a painting that Fritz and Thea Goldschmidt had owned prior to the Nazi regime, Tyrolean Woman with Cat” (“Tirolerin mit Katze”) by Lovis Corinth The painting appeared at the Im Kinsky auction house in Vienna on sale from an anonymous owner. The family, which was trying to locate the looted painting, asked Kinsky for information about the buyer, but the auction house refused. The family's effort was publicized by the Monuments Men Foundation which printed a card with information about the painting.

Tyrolean with Cat is one of ten art objects looted from the Goldschmidts that is currently listed on the German Lost Art Foundation's Lostart database.

== See also ==
- The Holocaust
- The history of the Jews in Germany
- Nuremberg Laws
