= Lovis Corinth =

German painter (1858–1925)

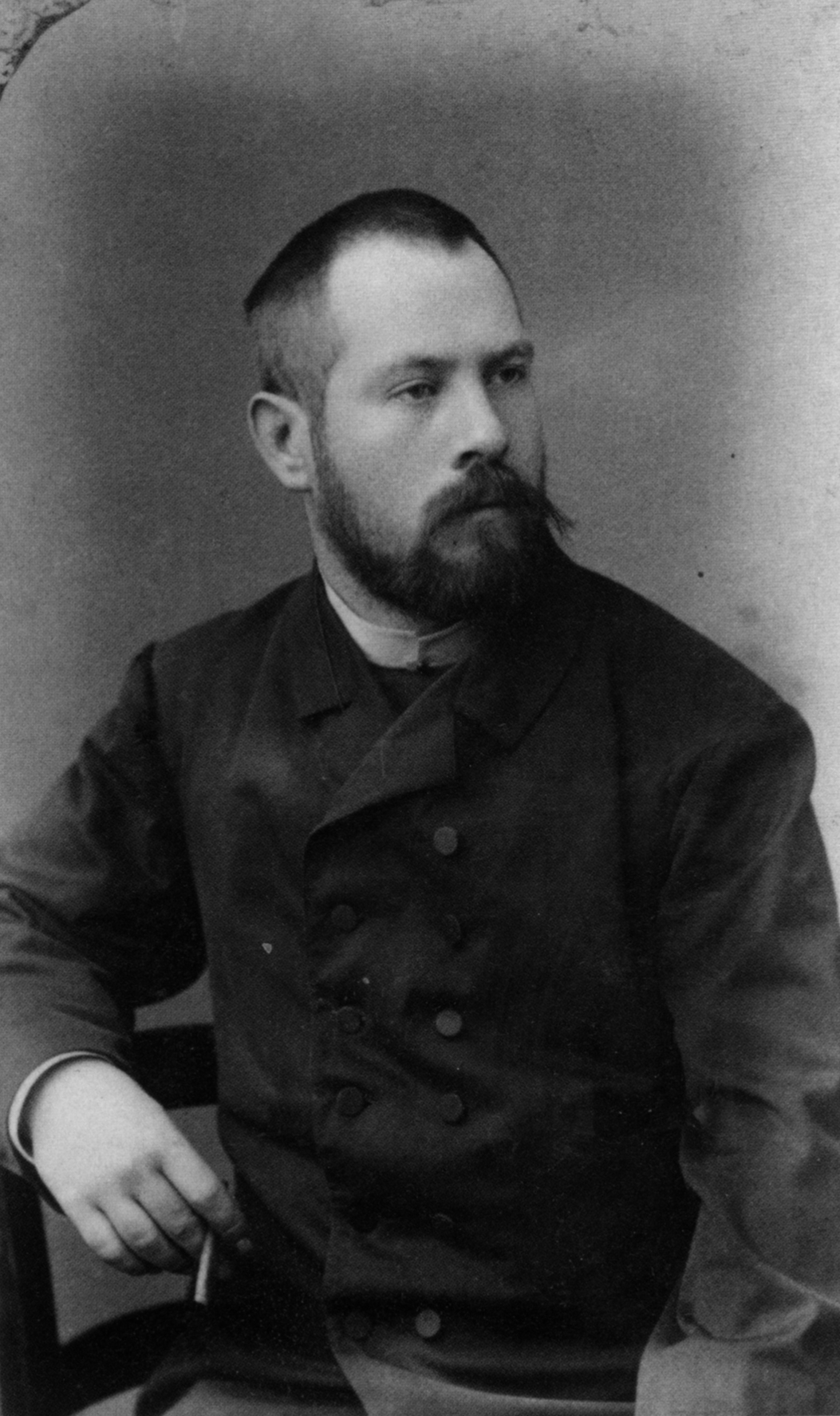
- Corinth in 1887
- Born: Franz Heinrich Louis; 21 July 1858; Tapiau, Kingdom of Prussia
- Died: 17 July 1925 (aged 66); Zandvoort, Netherlands
- Education: Academy of Fine Arts, Munich
- Spouse: Charlotte Berend-Corinth

Lovis Corinth (21 July 1858 – 17 July 1925) was a German artist and writer whose mature work as a painter and printmaker realized a synthesis of impressionism and expressionism.

Corinth studied at the Académie Julian in Paris and the Academy of Fine Arts, Munich, in Munich, joined the Berlin Secession group, later succeeding Max Liebermann as the group's president. His early work was naturalistic in approach. Corinth was initially antagonistic towards the expressionist movement, but after a stroke in 1911 his style loosened and took on many expressionistic qualities. His use of color became more vibrant, and he created portraits and landscapes of extraordinary vitality and power. Corinth's subject matter also included nudes and biblical scenes.

== Early life ==
Corinth was born Franz Heinrich Louis on 21 July 1858 in Tapiau, in the Province of Prussia in the Kingdom of Prussia. The son of a tanner, he displayed a talent for drawing as a child. In 1876, he went to study painting in the academy of Königsberg. Initially intending to become a history painter, he was dissuaded from this course by his chief instructor at the academy, the genre painter Otto Günther. In 1880, he traveled to Munich, which rivaled Paris as the avant-garde art center in Europe at the time. There he studied briefly with Franz von Defregger before gaining admission to the Academy of Fine Arts Munich, where he studied under Ludwig von Löfftz. The realism of Corinth's early works was encouraged by Löfftz's teaching, which emphasized careful observation of colors and values. Other important influences were Courbet and the Barbizon school, through their interpretation by the Munich artists Wilhelm Leibl and Wilhelm Trübner.

Except for an interruption for military service from 1882 to 1883, Corinth studied with Löfftz until 1884. He then traveled to Antwerp, where he greatly admired the paintings of Rubens, and then in October 1884 to Paris where he studied under William-Adolphe Bouguereau and Tony Robert-Fleury at the Académie Julian. He concentrated especially on improving his drawing skills, and made the female nude his frequent subject. He was disappointed, however, in his repeated failure to win a medal at the Salon, and returned to Königsberg in 1888 when he adopted the name "Lovis Corinth".

== Career ==
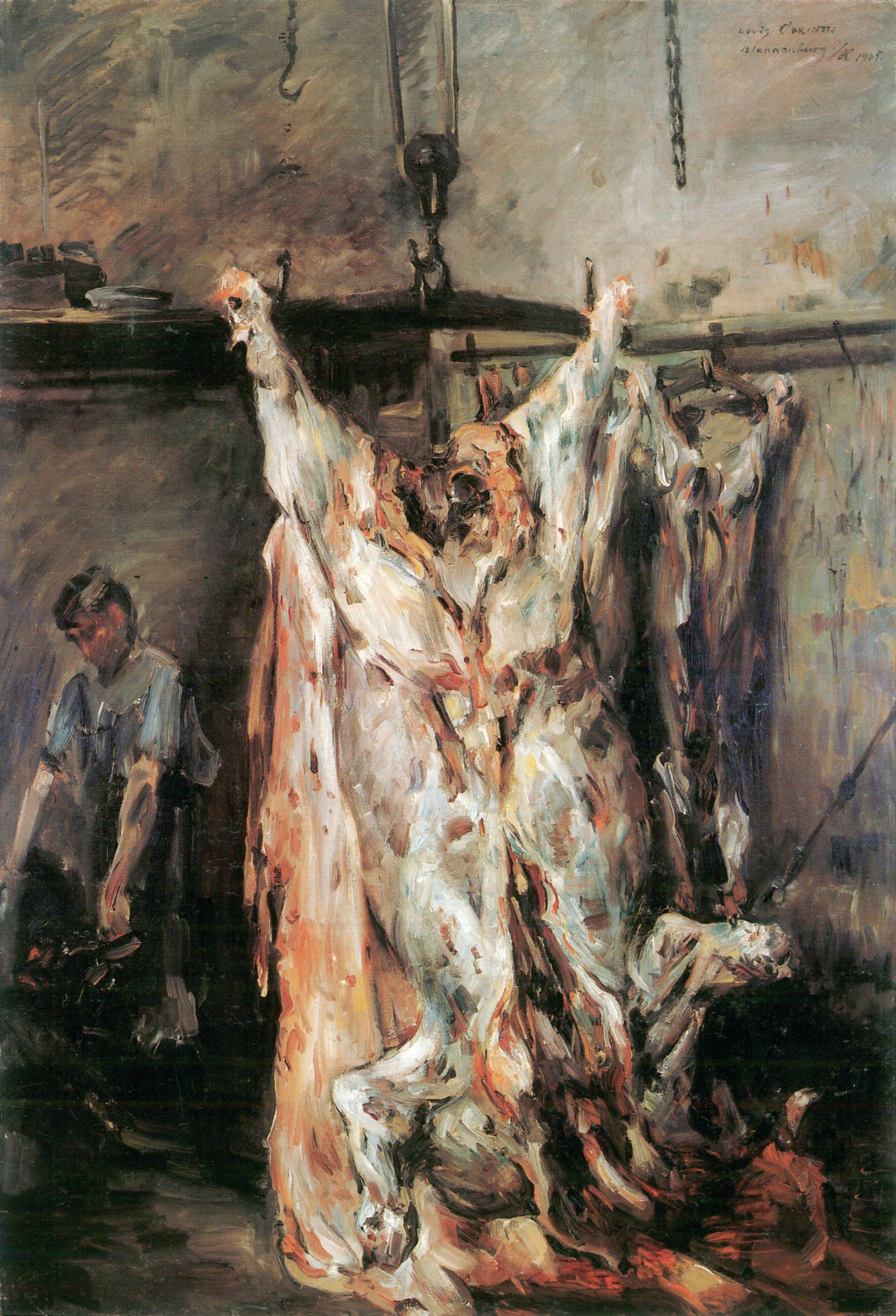
Slaughtered Ox (1905), oil on canvas, 160.5 x110.5 cm., Ostdeutsche Galerie Regensburg

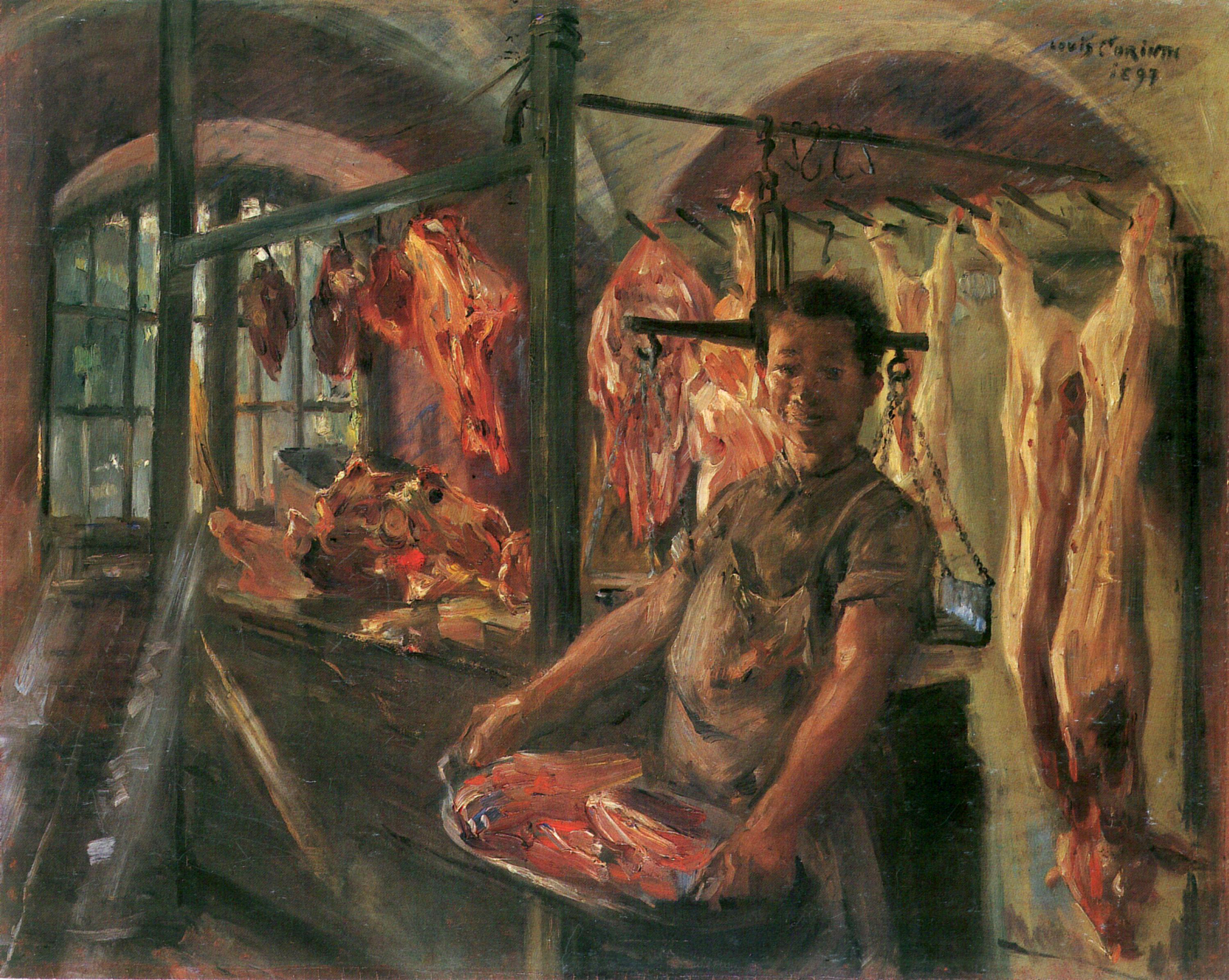
Butcher Store in Schäftlarn on the Isar (1897), Kunsthalle Bremen

In 1891, Corinth returned to Munich, but in 1892 he abandoned the Munich Academy and joined the Munich Secession. In 1894, he joined the Free Association, and in 1899 he participated in an exhibition organized by the Berlin Secession. These nine years in Munich were not his most productive, and he was perhaps better known for his ability to drink large amounts of red wine and champagne.

Corinth moved to Berlin in 1900, and had a one-man exhibition at a gallery owned by Paul Cassirer. In 1902 at the age of 43, he opened a school of painting for women and married his first student, Charlotte Berend, some 20 years his junior. Charlotte was his youthful muse, his spiritual partner, and the mother of his two children. She had a profound influence on him, and family life became a major theme in his art. Another of his students was Doramaria Purschian.

He published numerous essays on art history, and in 1908 published Das Erlernen der Malerei ("On Learning to Paint").

In December 1911, he suffered a stroke, and was partially paralyzed on his left side. Thereafter, he walked with a limp, and his hands displayed a chronic tremor. With the help of his wife, within a year he was painting again with his right hand. His disability inspired in the artist an intense interest in the simple, intimate things of daily life. In the summer of 1919, for example, he produced a cycle of casual etchings of his family in their country home. It was also at this time that landscapes became a significant part of his oeuvre. These landscapes were set at the Walchensee, a lake in the Bavarian Alps where Corinth owned a house. Their lively picturing, in bright colors, tempt many to consider the Walchensee series as his best work.

He painted numerous self-portraits, and made a habit of painting one every year on his birthday as a means of self-examination. In many of his self-portraits he assumed guises such as an armored knight (The Victor, 1910), or Samson (The Blinded Samson, 1912).

Not all of Corinth's works were appreciated in his lifetime: upon learning of his death, Danish critic Georg Brandes wrote in a letter to his secretary that it was Corinth's "punishment for such a wretched portrait of myself".

From 1915 to 1925, he served as President of the Berlin Secession. In 1920 an anthology of his art-historical writings was published in Berlin. In 1922, his works were exhibited in the Venice Biennale. On 15 March 1921 Corinth received an honorary doctorate from the University of Königsberg. In 1925, he traveled to the Netherlands to view the works of his favorite Dutch masters. He caught pneumonia and died in Zandvoort. He was buried at Stahnsdorf South-Western Cemetery near Berlin.

=== Printmaking ===
Corinth explored every print technique except aquatint; he favored drypoint and lithography. He created his first etching in 1891 and his first lithograph in 1894. He experimented with the woodcut medium but made only 12 woodcuts, all of them between 1919 and 1924. He was quite prolific, and in the last 15 years of his life he produced more than 900 graphic works, including 60 self-portraits. The landscapes he created between 1919 and 1925 are perhaps the most desirable images of his entire graphic oeuvre.

== Legacy ==
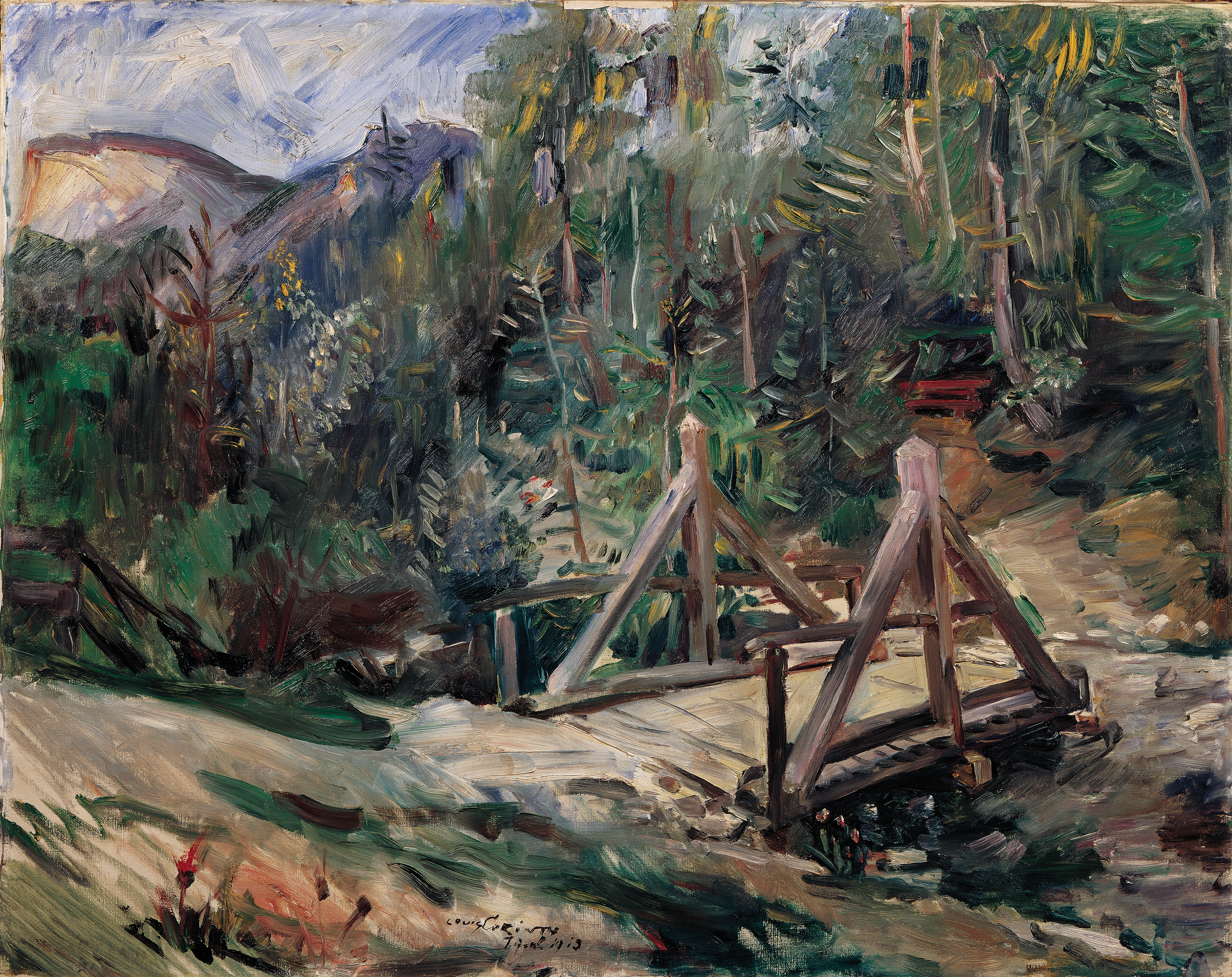
Tyrolean Landscape with a Bridge (1913), oil on canvas, 95.5 x 120.5 cm., Österreichische Galerie Belvedere, Vienna

The house where Corinth was born is still in the town of Tapiau, which is now called Gvardeysk, and located in Kaliningrad Oblast, Russia.

In 1910 Corinth had donated the painting Golgatha for the altar of the church of his birthplace, Tapiau. At the end of the Second World War, when the Red Army invaded East Prussia, this painting disappeared without trace. Tapiau was among the few East Prussian places not devastated by the war, which makes it likely that the painting was looted rather than destroyed.

In 1926, a commemorative exhibition of Corinth's paintings and watercolors was presented at the Nationalgalerie in Berlin, and an exhibition of his prints and drawings was held at the Berlin Academy. By 1930 the Nationalgalerie acquired several major paintings by Corinth in addition to those already in its collection.

During the Third Reich, Corinth's work was condemned by the Nazis as degenerate art. In 1937, Nazi authorities removed 295 of his works from public collections, and transported seven of them to Munich where they were displayed in March 1937 in the Degenerate Art Exhibition.

From 8 October - 19 December 1999, the Fundación Juan March, Madrid collaborated with the Von der Heydt Museum in Wuppertal on the first retrospective in Spain of Corinth’s work.

In 2007, the German city of Hanover returned a painting by Corinth to the heirs of Jewish collector Curt Glaser, who sold it in 1933 to fund his escape from the Nazis. The painting from 1914, Römische Campagna (Roman Landscape), was handed to Glaser's heirs, represented by his U.S.-based niece and her daughter.

In 2015 heirs of Holocaust victims Thea and Fritz Goldschmidt made a restitution claim for Covinth's Tyrolean Woman with Cat" ("Tirolerin mit Katze") after the painting appeared at the Im Kinsky auction house in Vienna on sale from an anonymous owner. The Austrian auction house refused to say who bought the looted painting. The painting is listed on the German Lost Art Foundation Lostart Database and on the Monuments Men Foundation's "Most Wanted List" of stolen art.

In June 2021, the Royal Museums of Fine Arts of Belgium in Brussels agreed to return Corinth's 1913 Blumenstilleben (Still Life with Flowers) to the heir of Gustav and Emma Mayer, who were persecuted by the Nazis and forced to flee because of their Jewish heritage.

== Galleries ==
Landscapes and still lifes

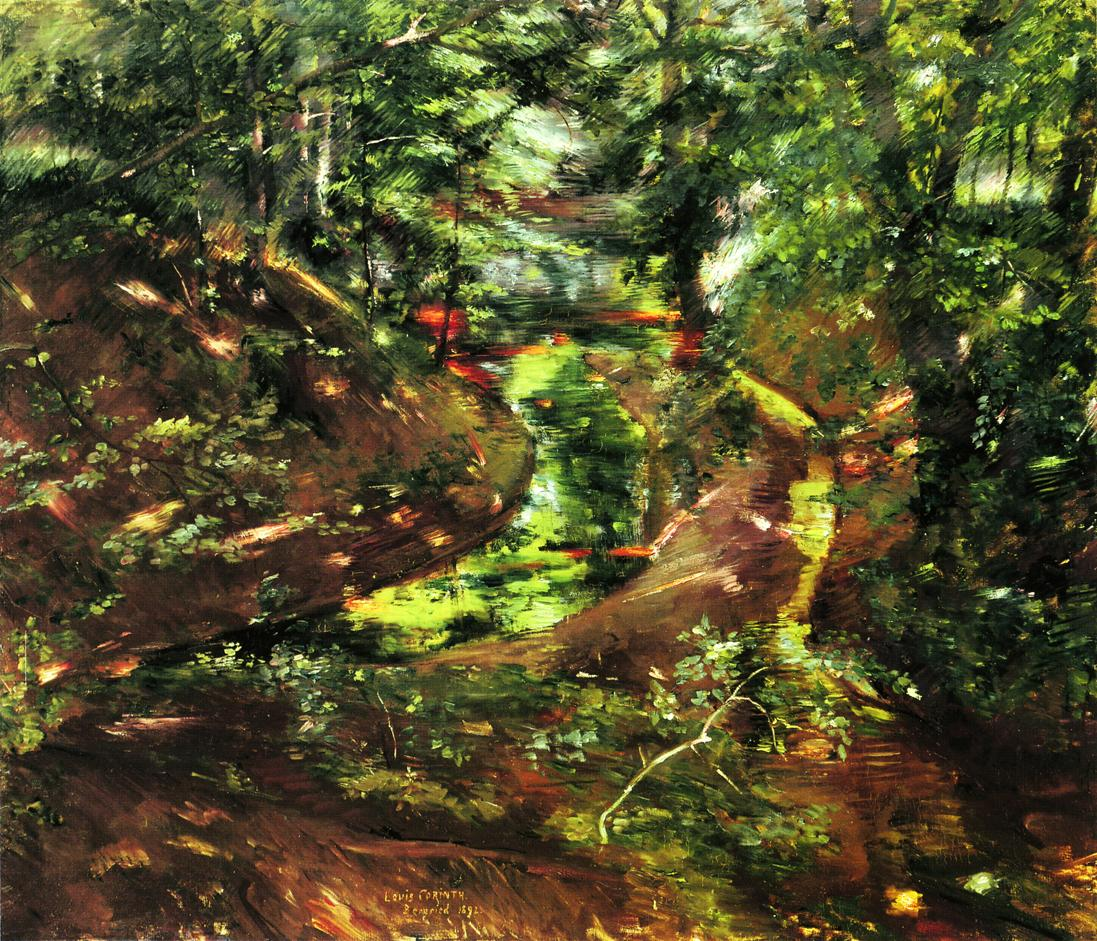
Forest Interior in Bernried (1892), oil on canvas, 94 × 110 cm., Galerie G. Paffrath, Düsseldorf

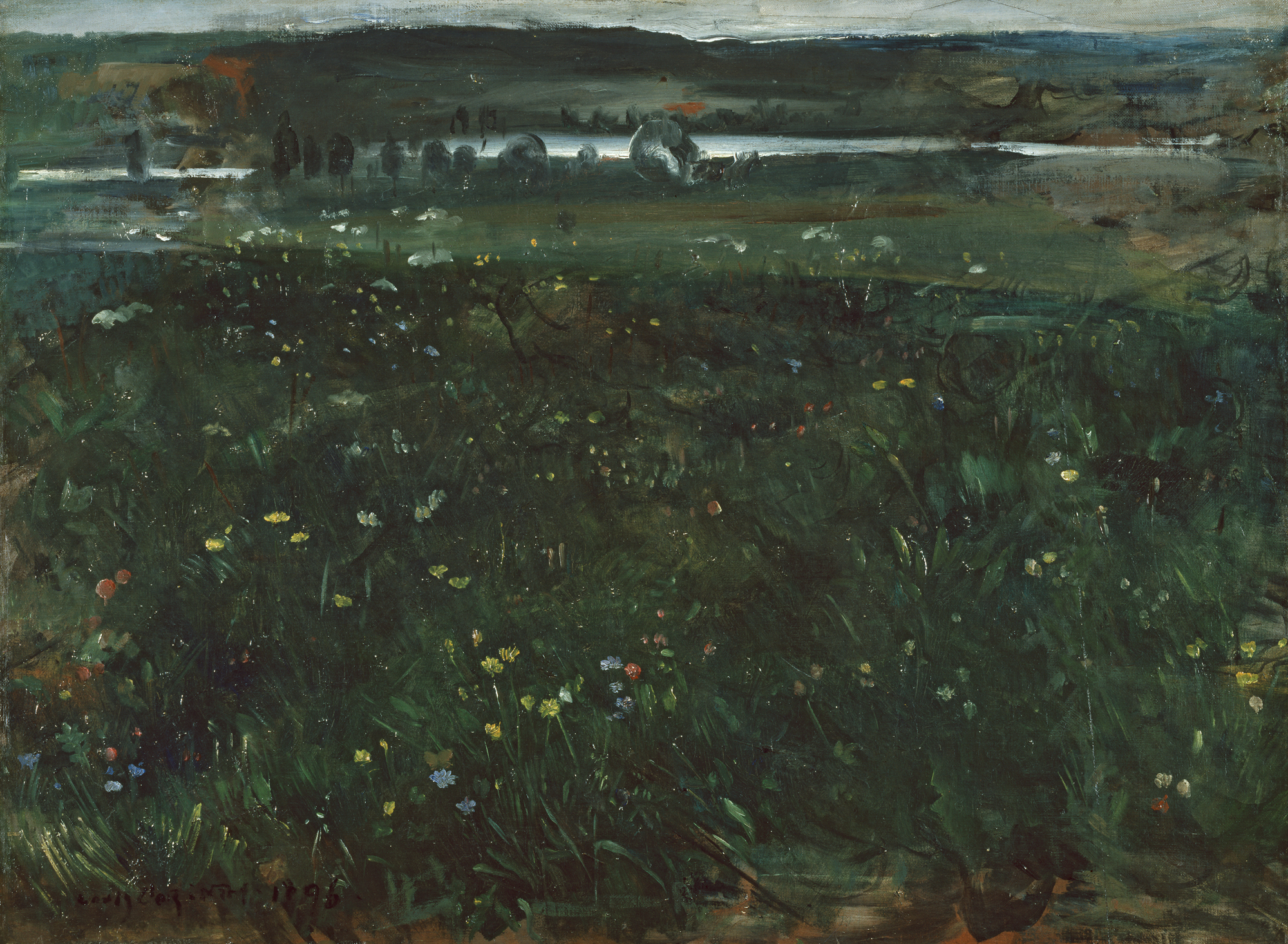
At Unter Schäftlarn on the Isar (1896), oil on canvas, 60 x 82 cm., Lenbachhaus, in Munich

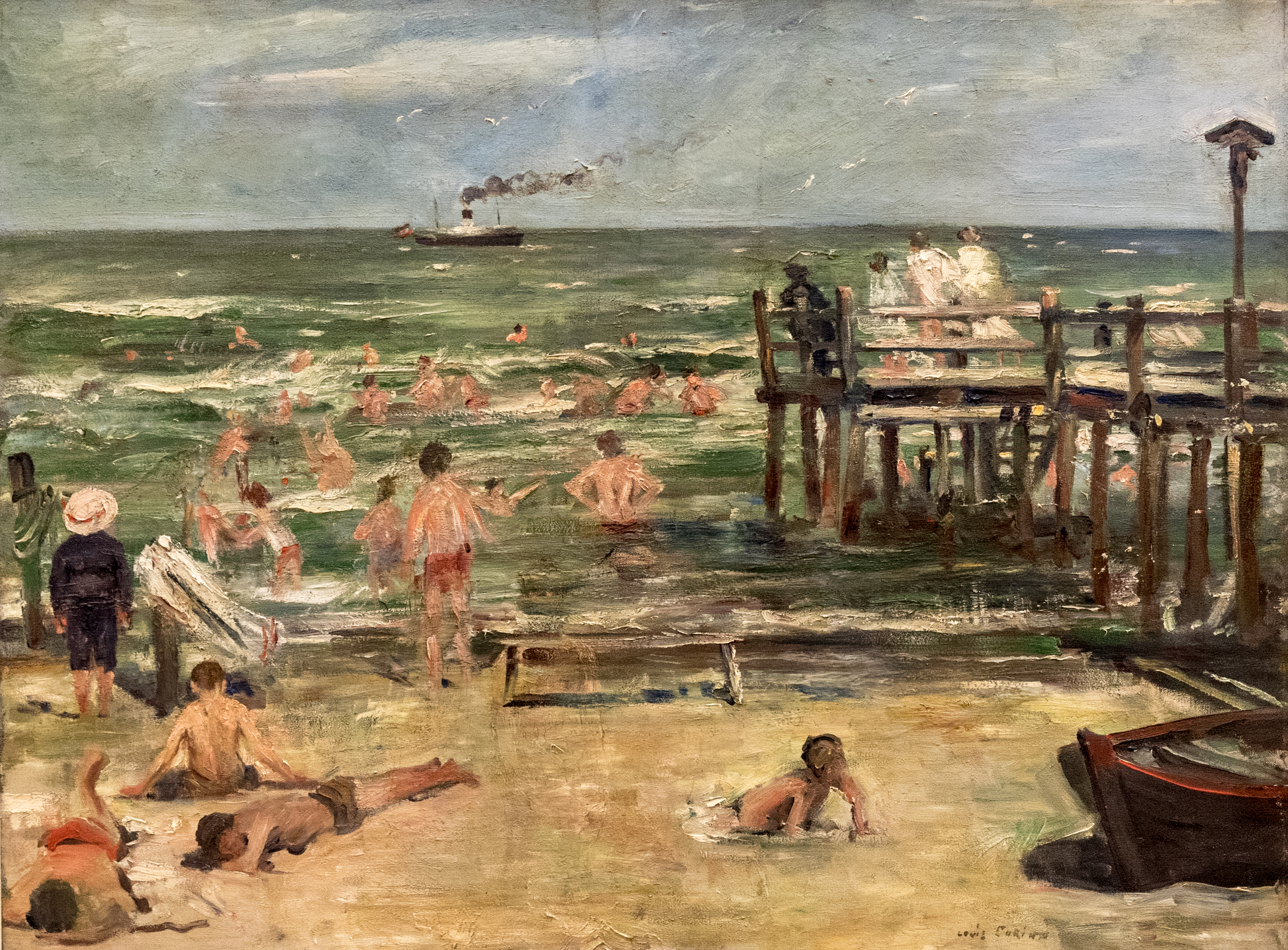
Swimming Facility in Horst-Ostsee (1902), oil on canvas, Museum Georg Schäfer, Schweinfurt

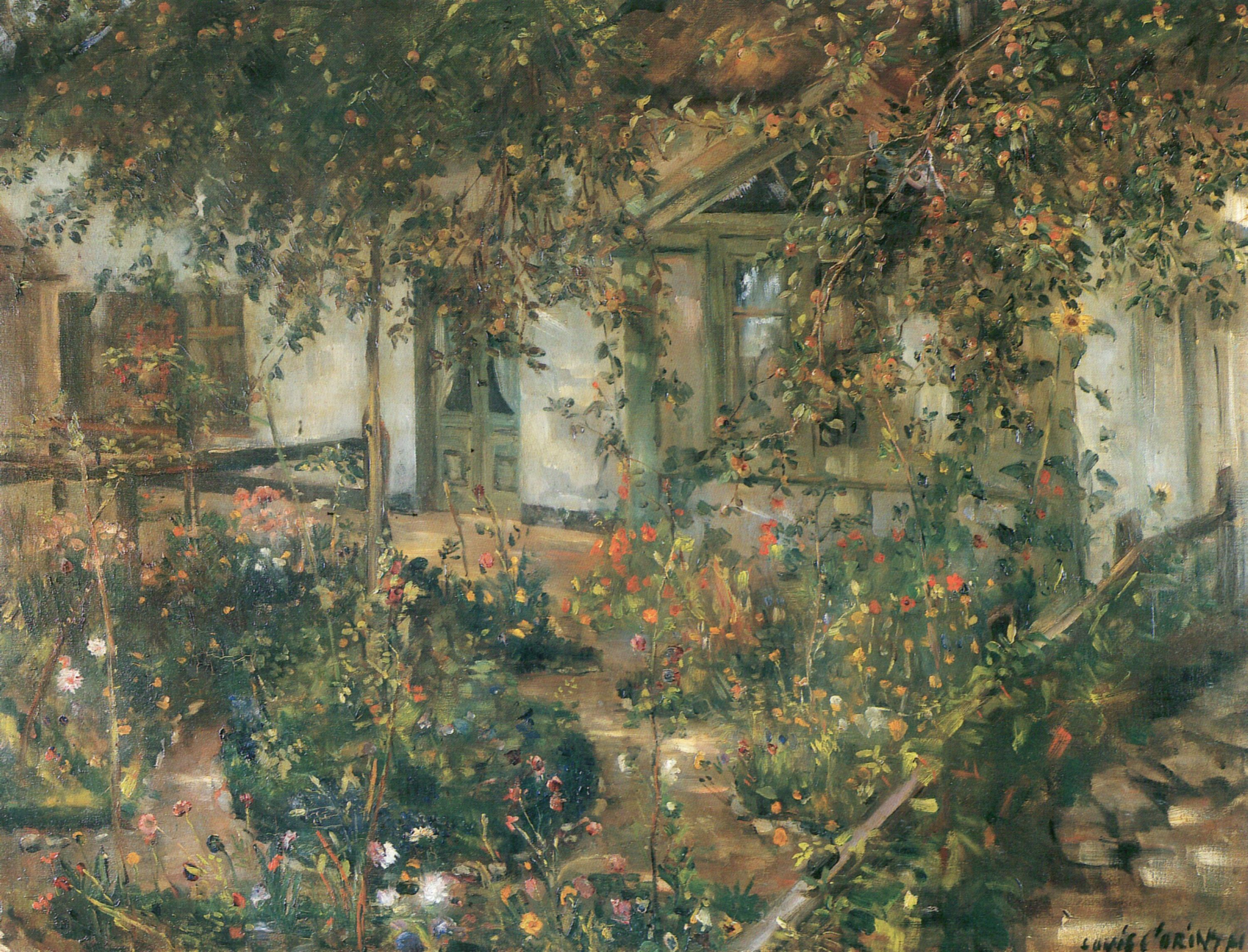
Blooming Cottage Garden (1904), oil on canvas, 76 x 100 cm., Museum Wiesbaden

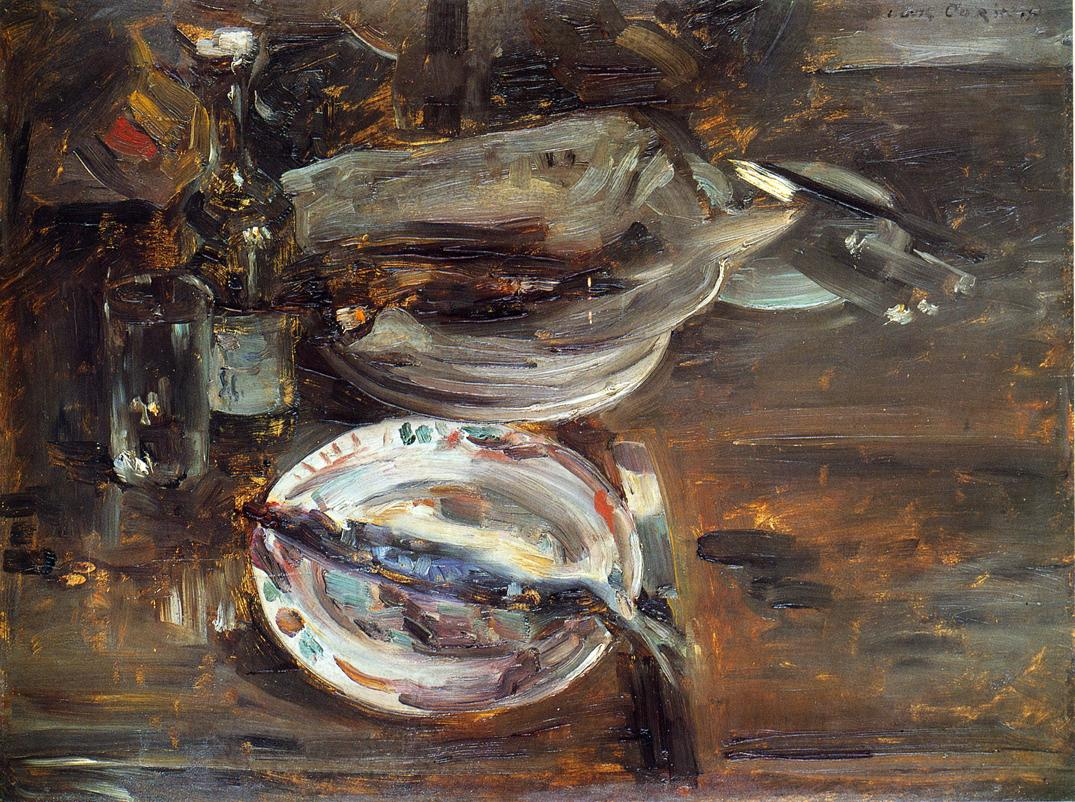
Hangover Breakfast (1913), oil on cardboard, 52 x 69 cm., private collection

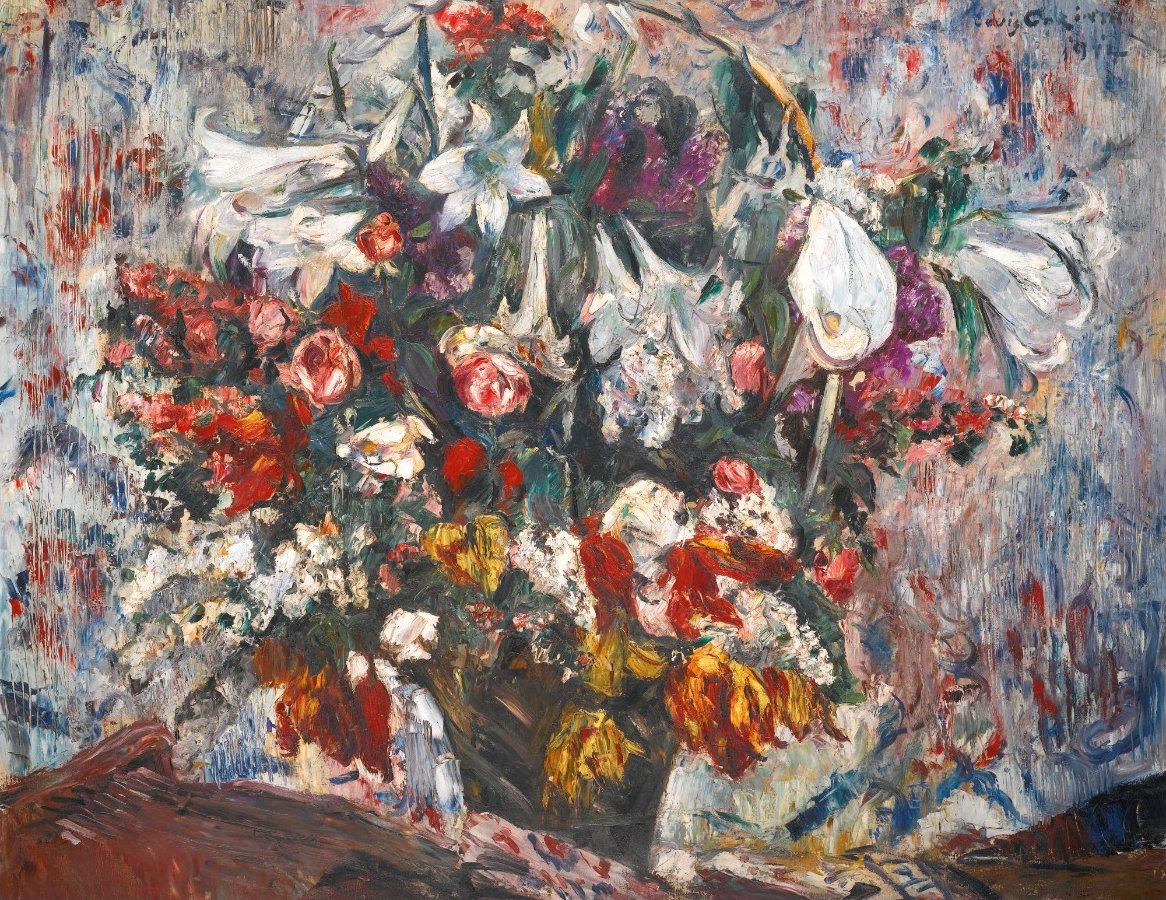
Flower Basket with Amaryllis, Lilac, Roses and Tulips (1914), oil on canvas, 109.4 x 138.8 cm., collection unknown

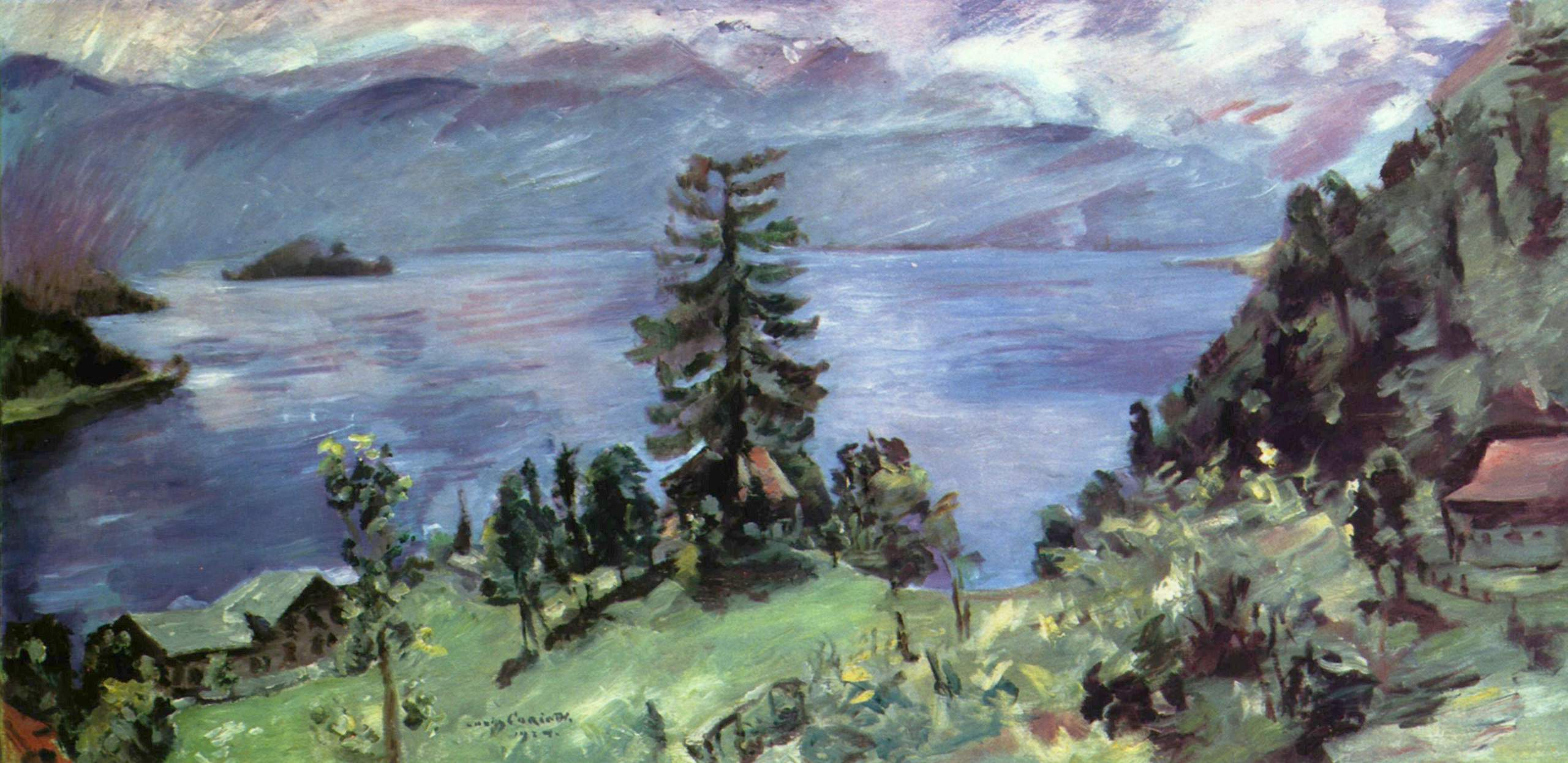
Walchensee Panorama, View from the Pulpit (1924), oil on canvas, 100 x 200 cm., Wallraf–Richartz Museum, Cologne

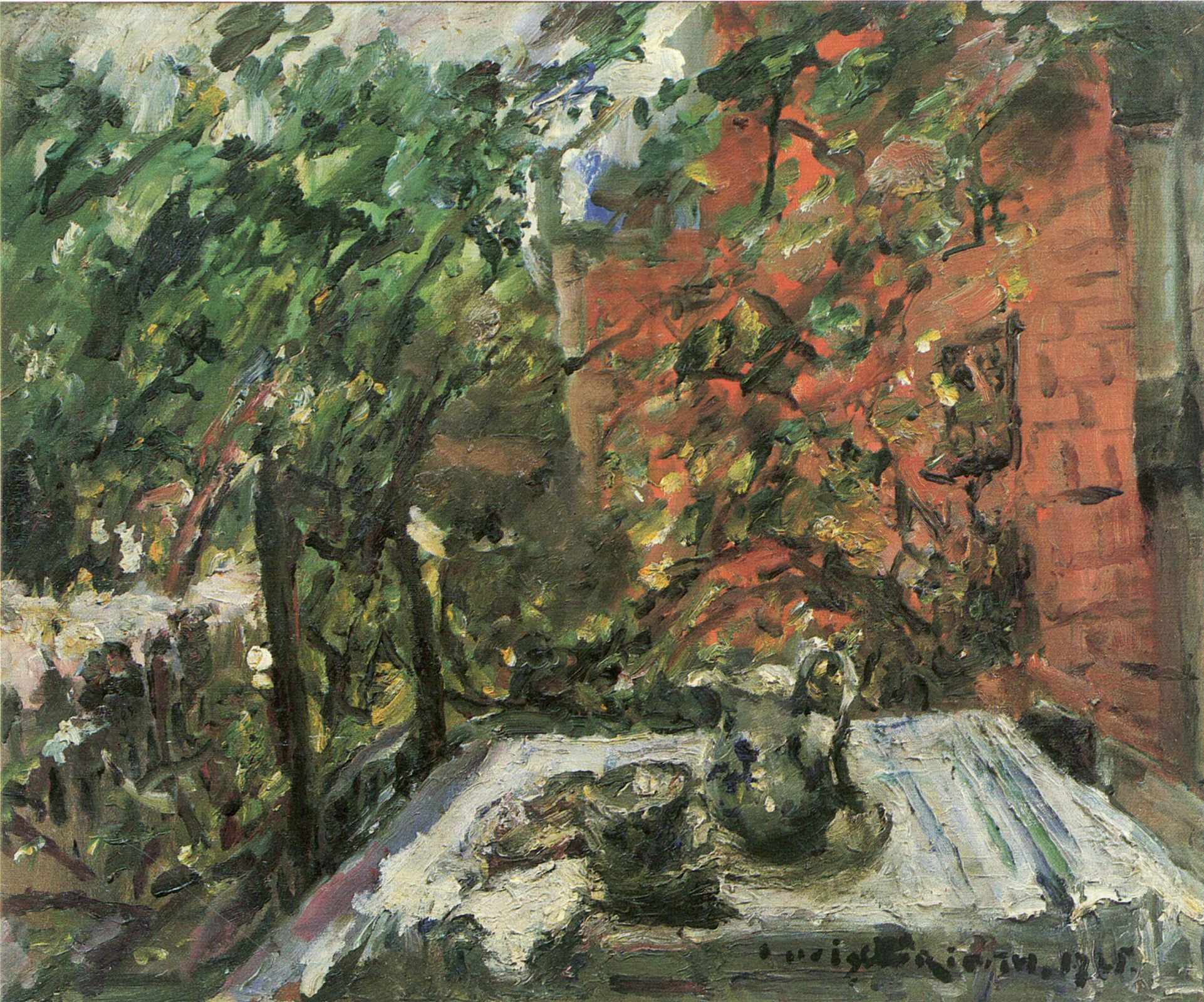
Vespers on the Balcony (1925), oil on canvas, 49 × 60 cm., Berlinische Galerie, Berlin

Figures and portraits

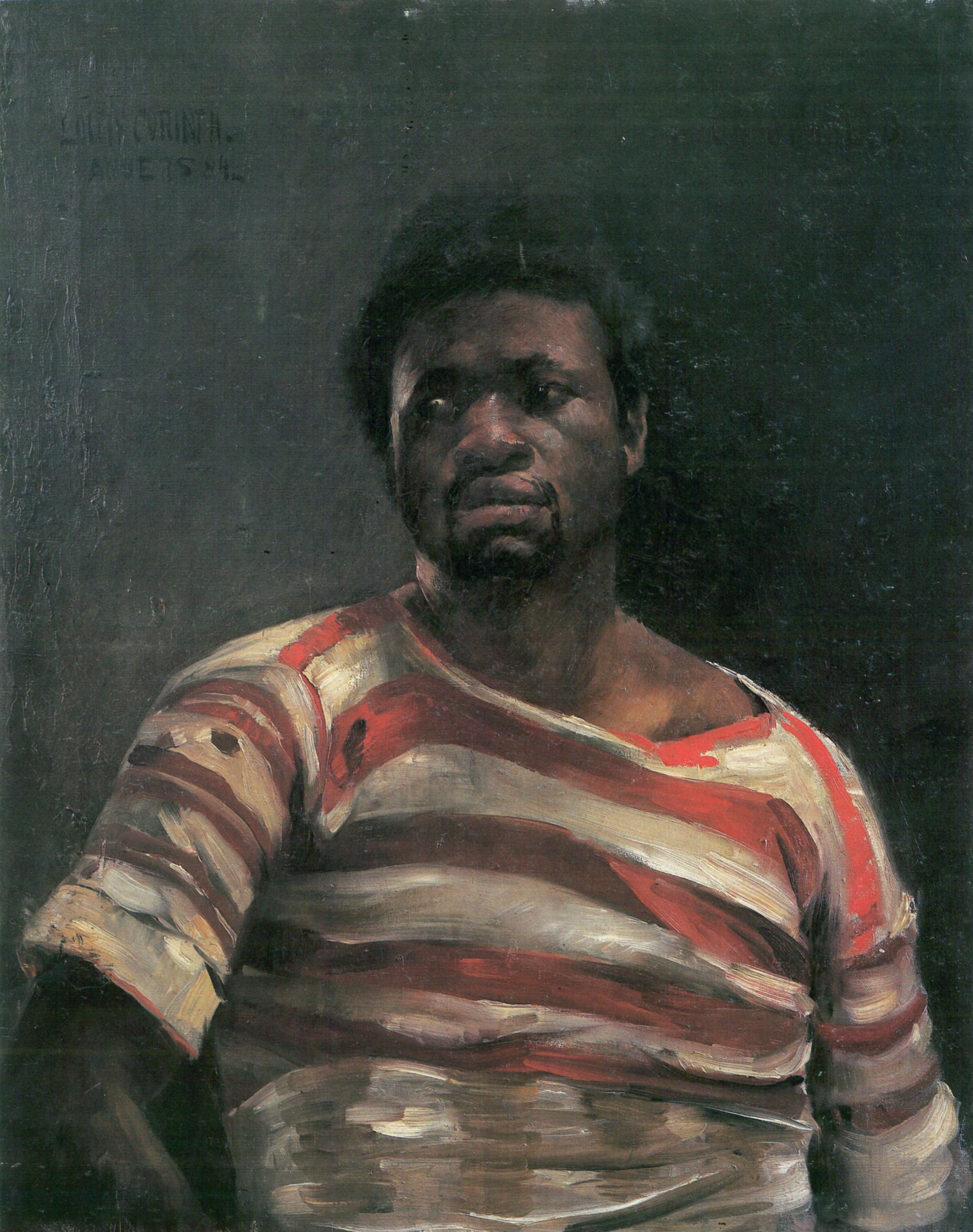
Othello (1884), oil on canvas, 78 x 58.5 cm., private collection

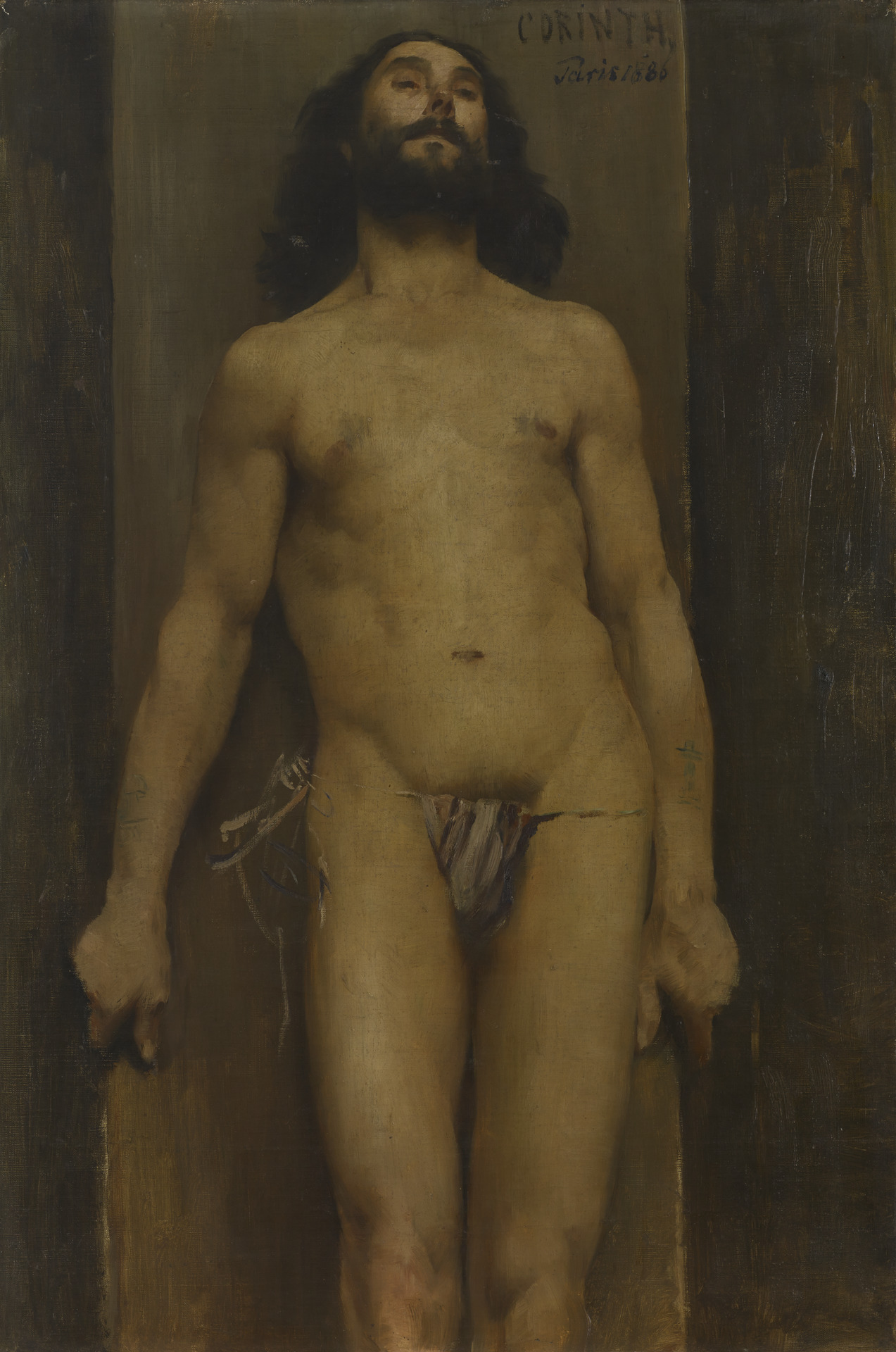
Male Nude (1886), oil on canvas, 85 x 55 cm., Yale University Gallery, New Haven,

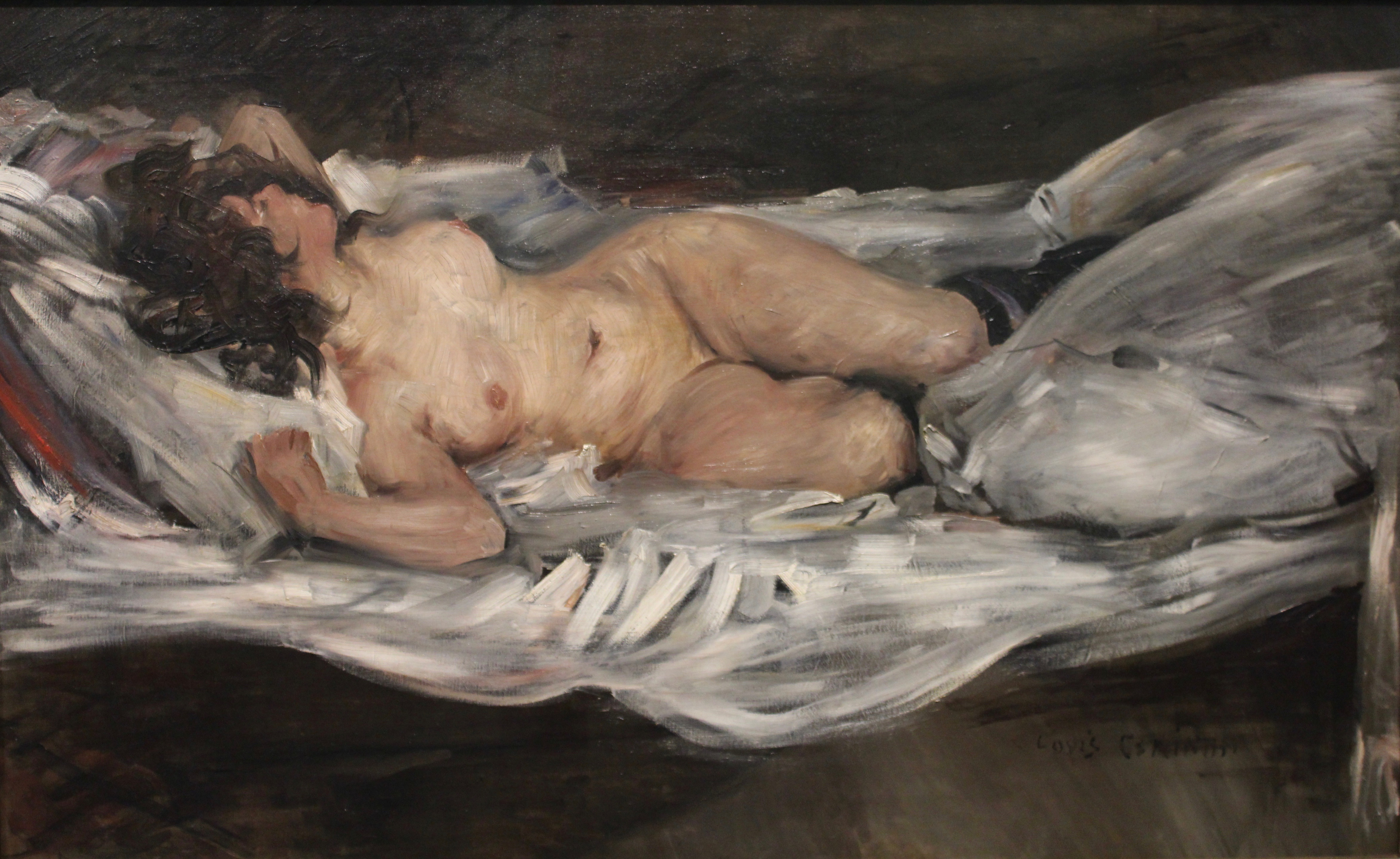
Reclining Female Nude (1899), oil on canvas, 75.5 cm (29.7 in); Width: 120.5 cm., Kunsthalle Bremen

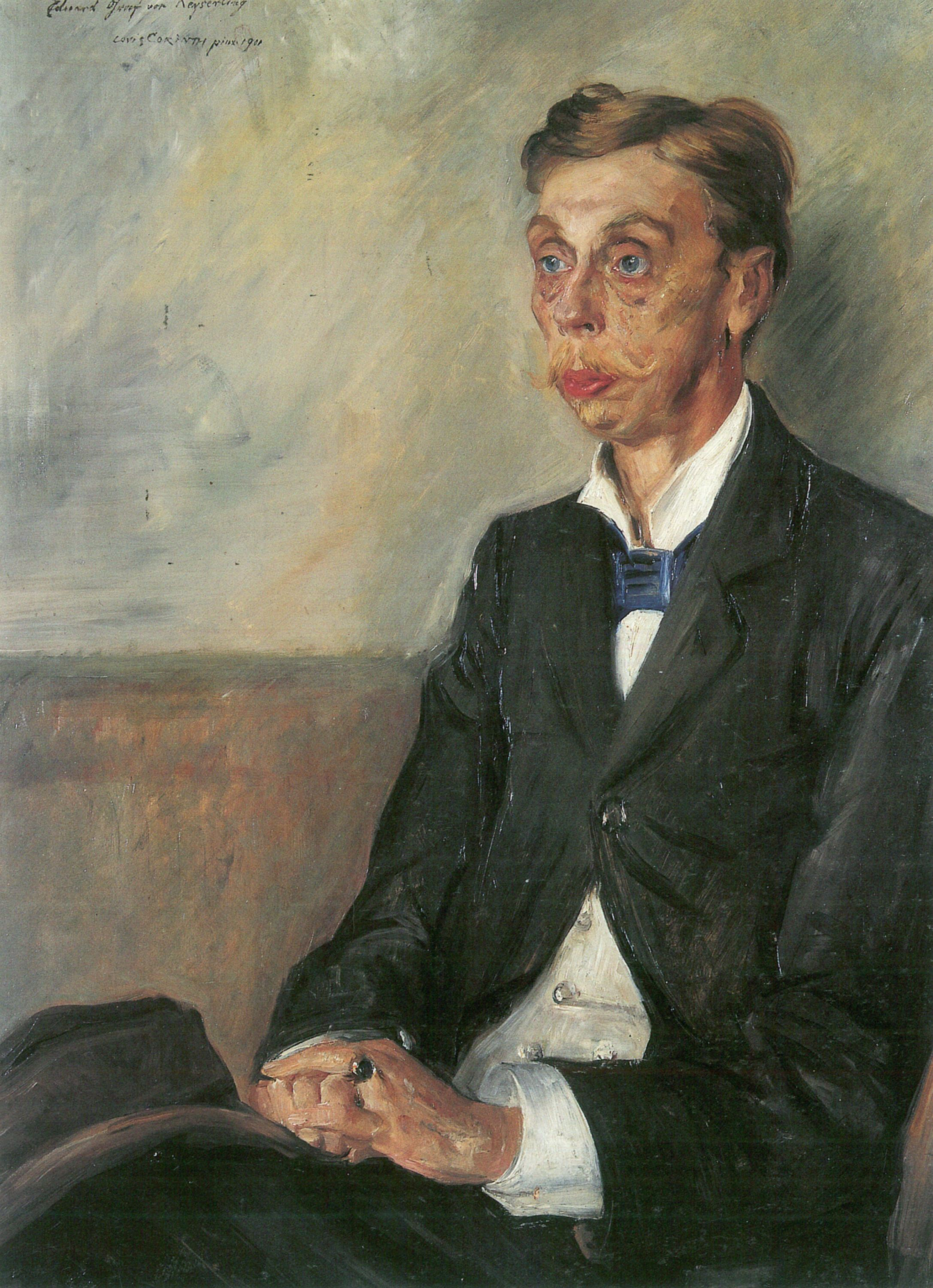
Count Eduard von Keyserling (1900), oil on canvas, 79.5 × 75.5 cm., Städtische Galerie Lenbachhaus, Munich

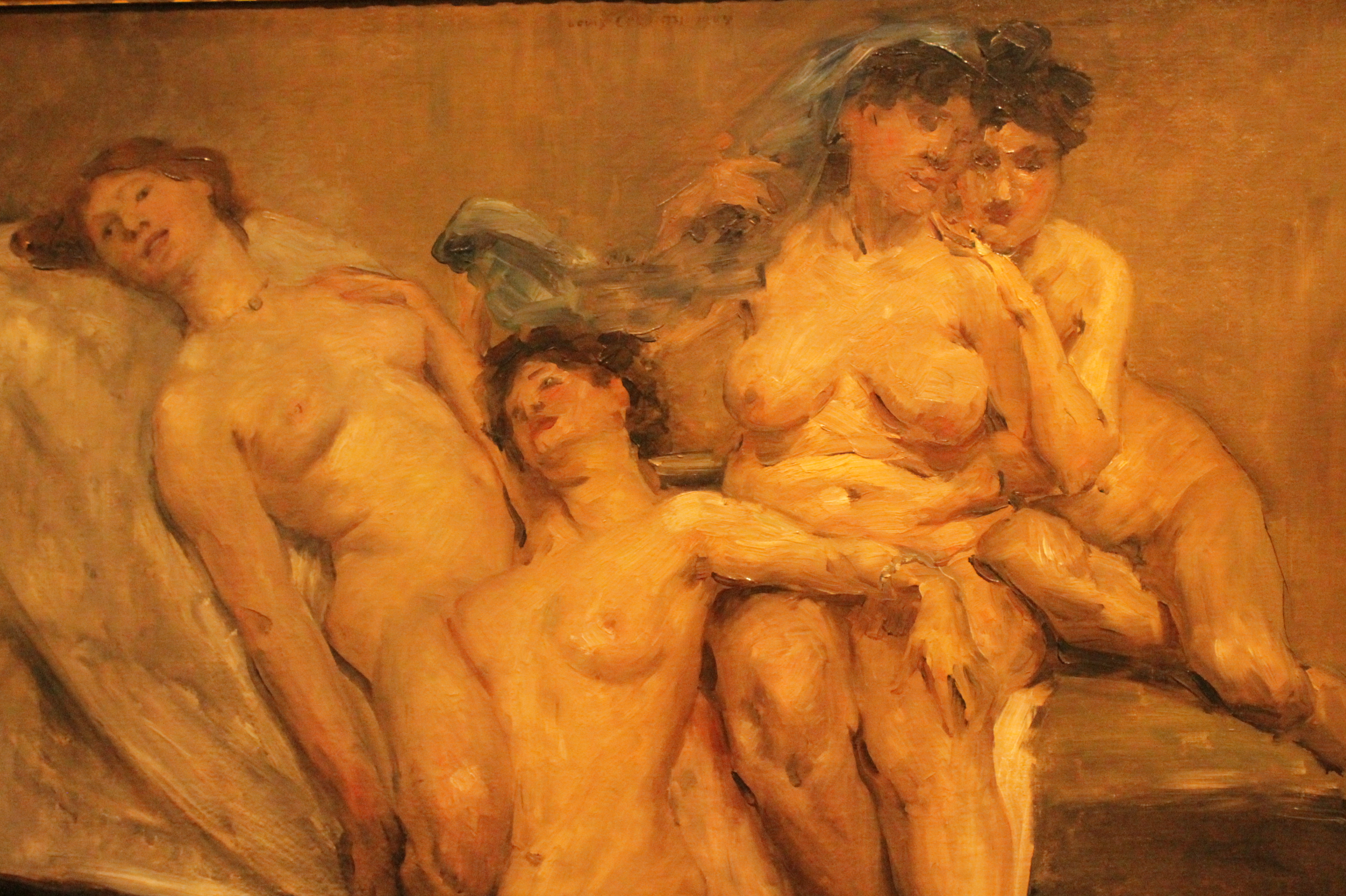
Group of Friends by Lovis Corinth (1904), oil on canvas, Albertinum, Dresden

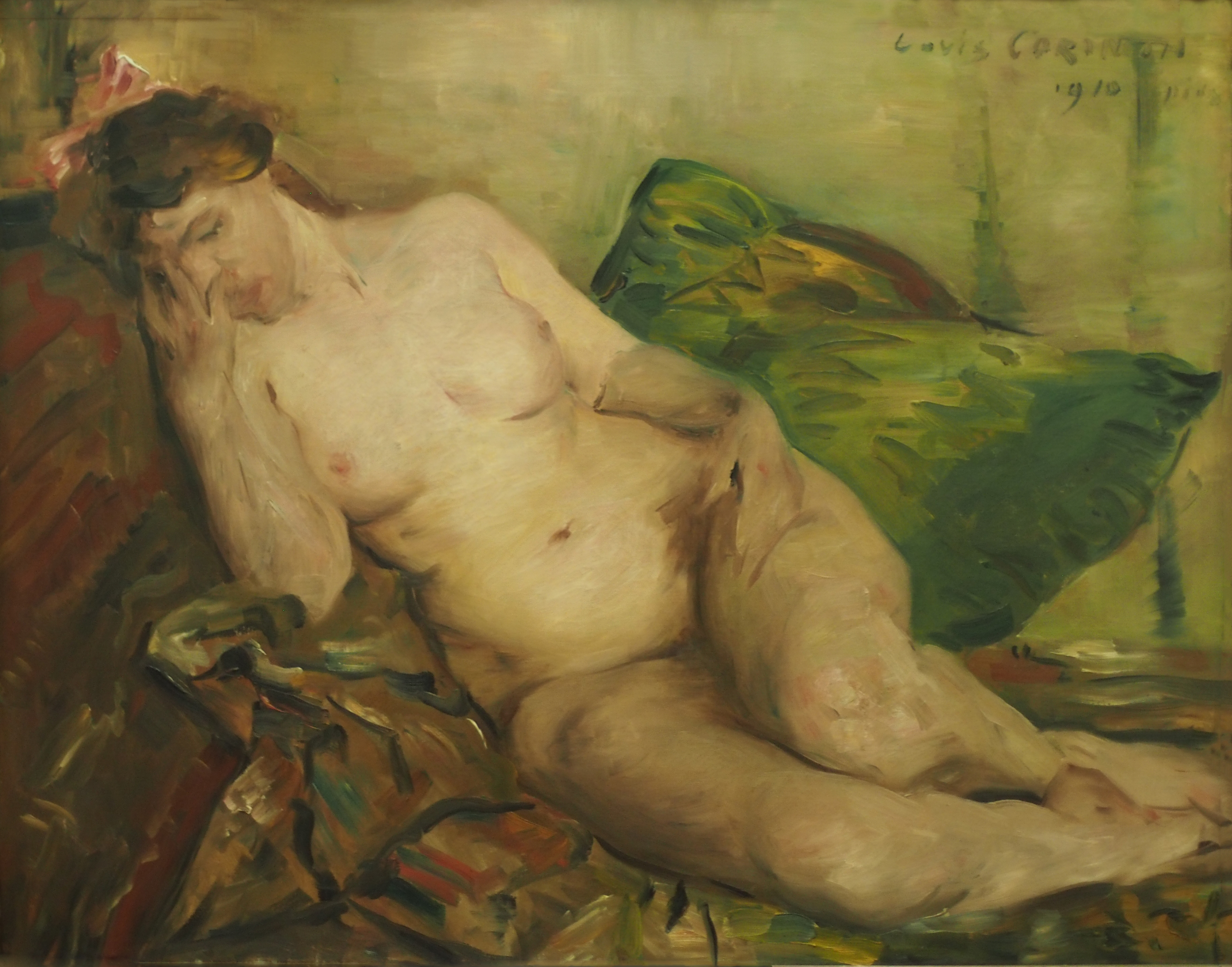
Reclining Nude (1910), oil on canvas, Landesmuseum Hannover, Hanover

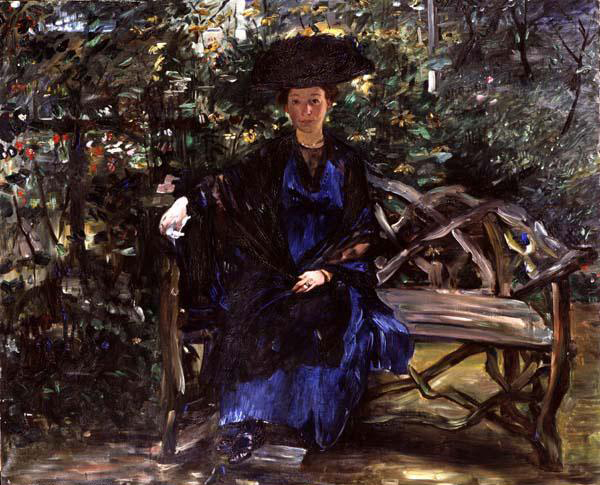
Portrait of Mrs. Kaumann (1911), oil on canvas, 99 x 120 cm., Kunsthalle Kiel

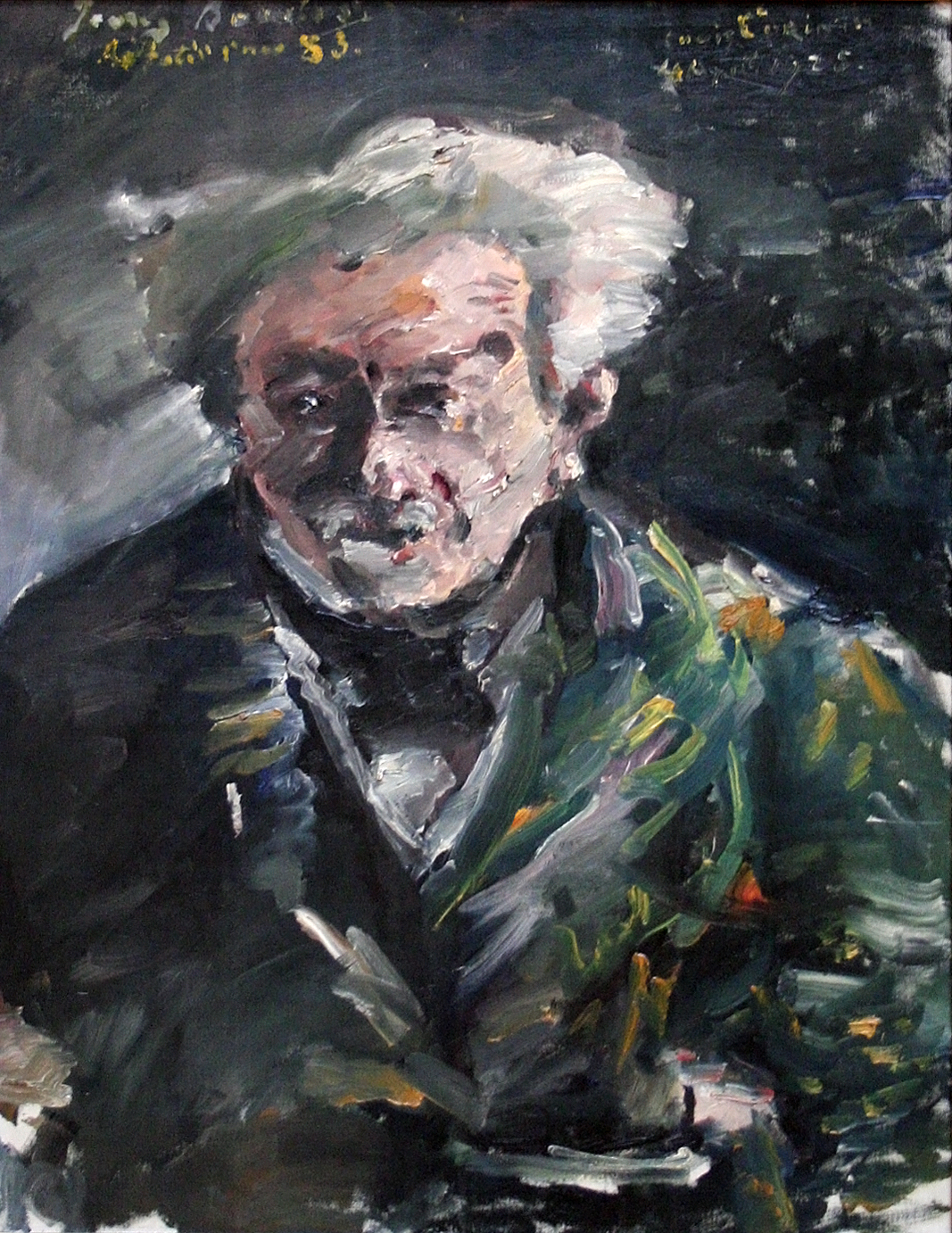
Georg Brandes (1925), oil on canvas, 111 x 91.5 cm., Royal Museum of Fine Arts, Antwerp

Wife, family and self portraits

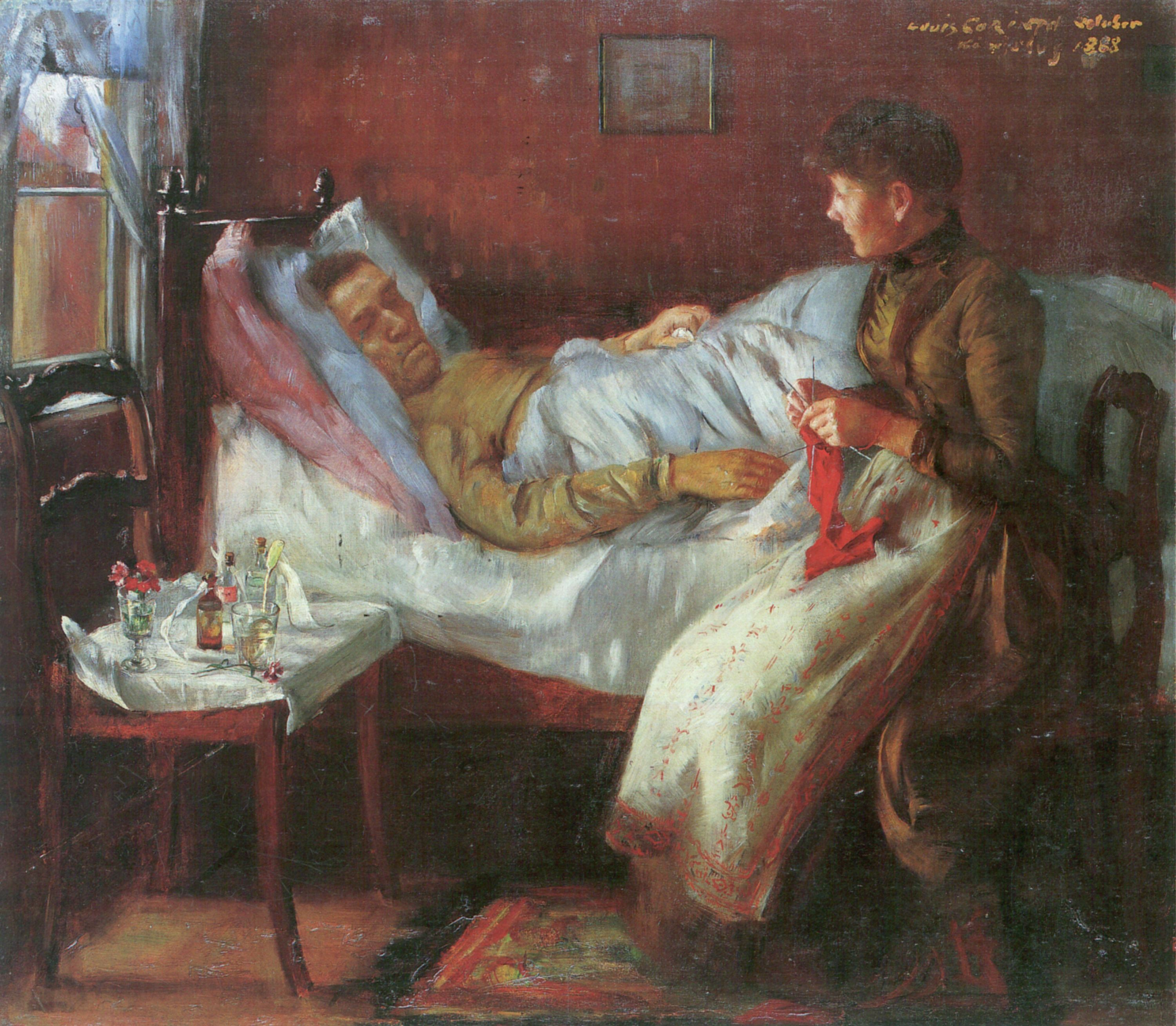
The Artist's Father in his Sickbed (1888), oil on canvas, 61 × 70 cm., Städelsches Kunstinstitut und Städtische Galerie, Frankfurt

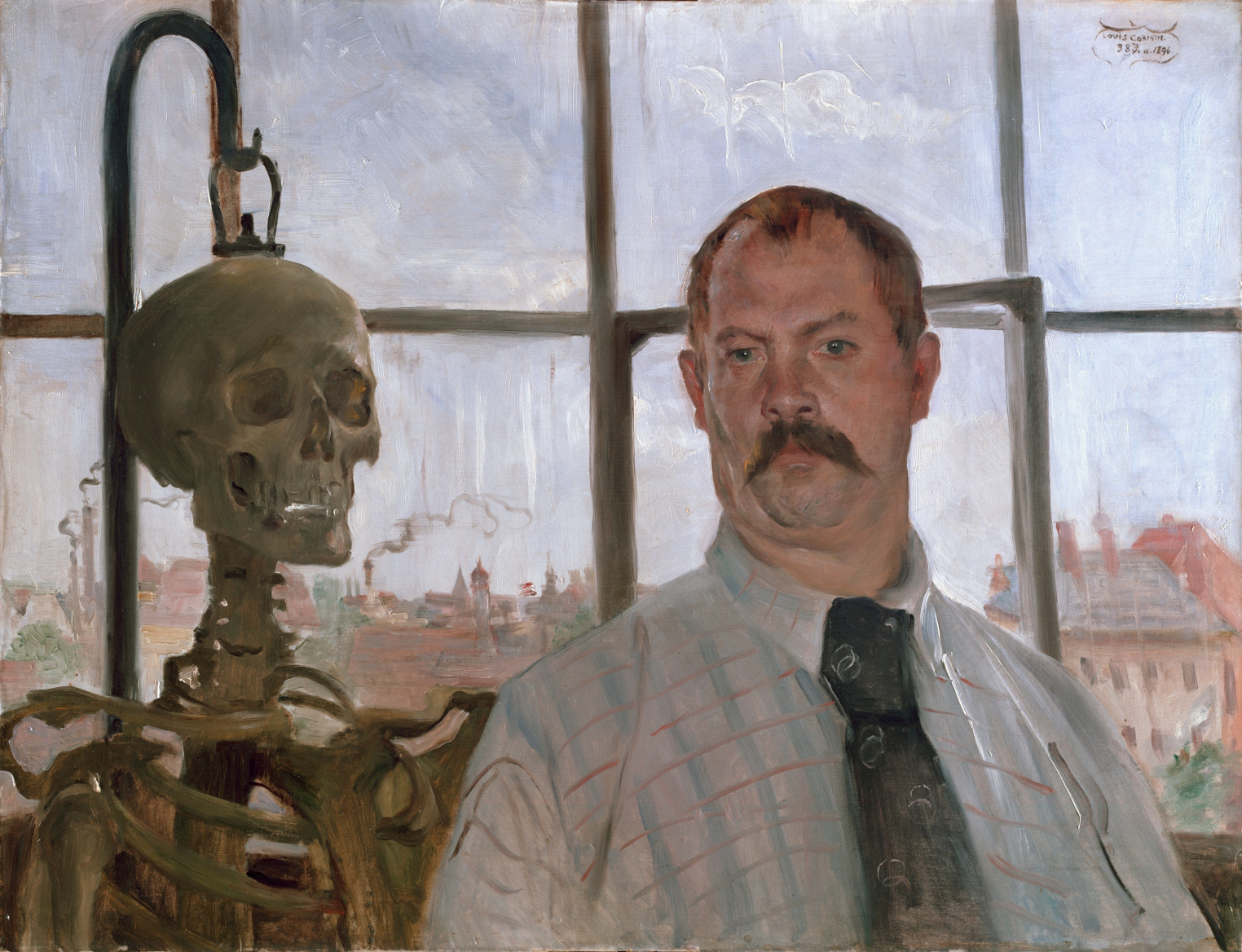
Self-Portrait with Skeleton (1896), oil on canvas, 66 x 86 cm, Städtische Galerie im Lenbachhaus

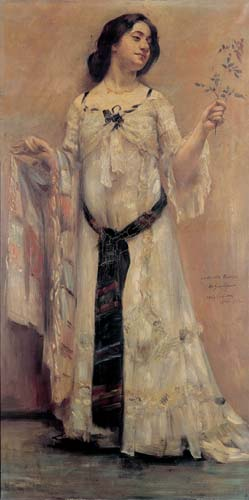
Charlotte in a White Dress (1902), oil on canvas, 105 x 54 cm., Stiftung Stadtmuseum, Berlin

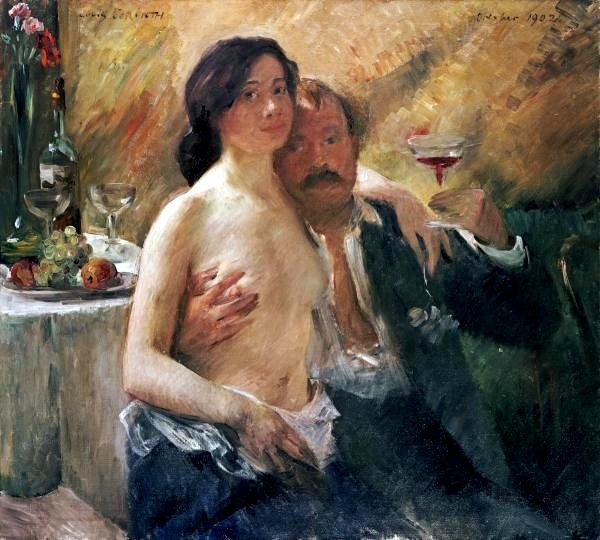
Self Portrait with his Wife [Charlotte Berend] and Champagne Glass (1902), oil on canvas, 97 × 107 cm., private collection

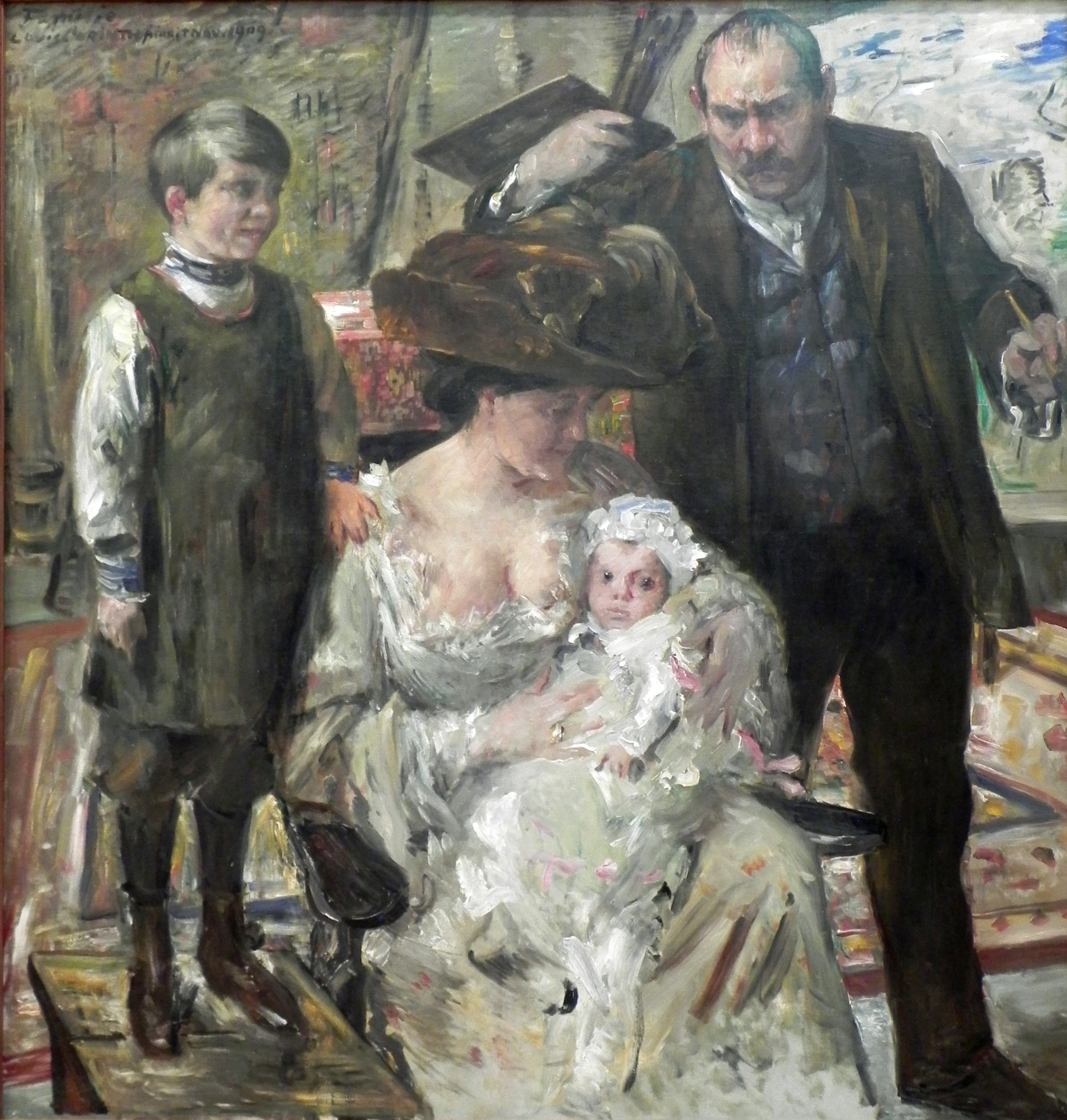
The Artist and His Family (1909), oil on canvas, Niedersächsisches Landesmuseum, Hanover

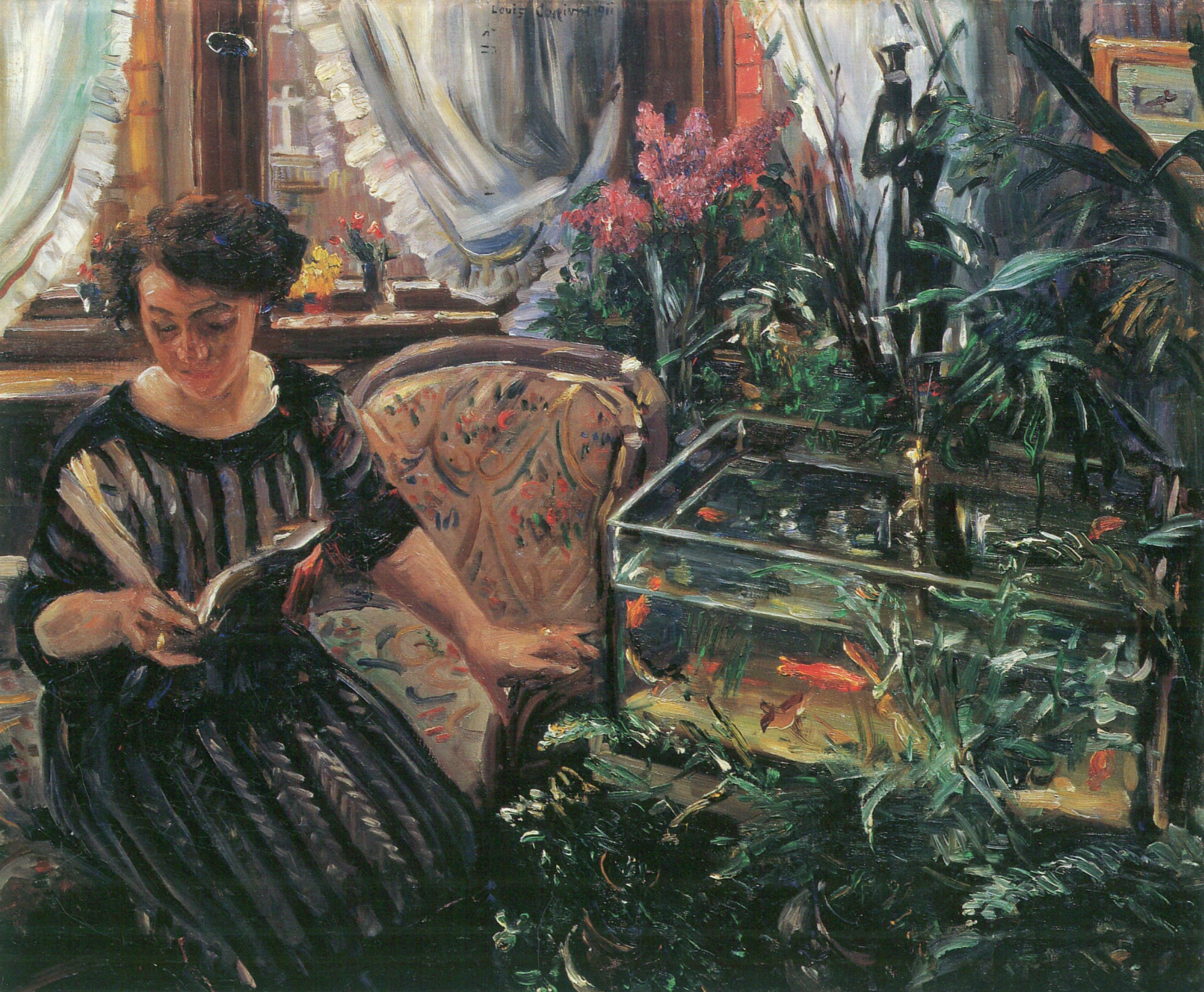
Lady at the Goldfish Basin (1911), oil on canvas, 74 x 90.5 cm., Österreichische Galerie

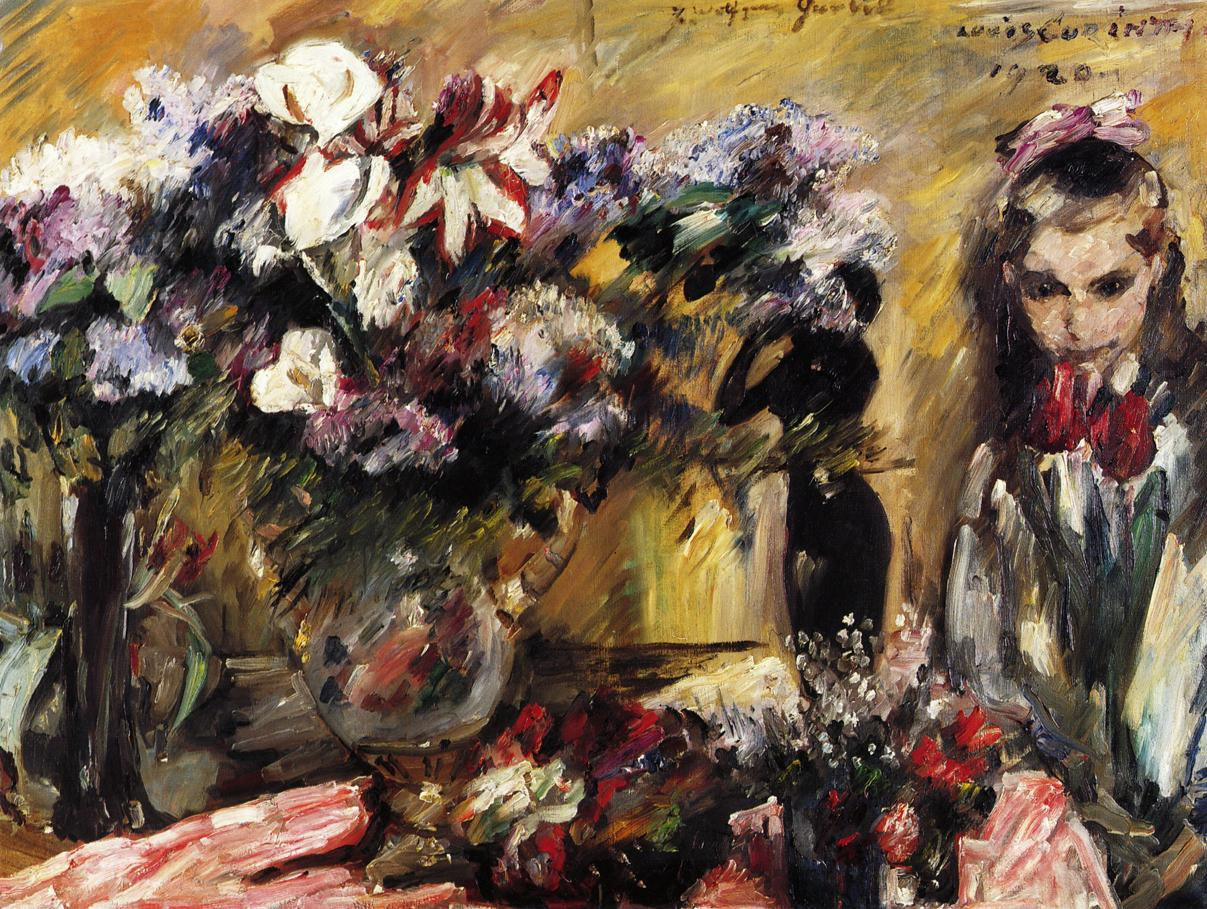
Flowers and Daughter Wilhelmine (1920), oil on canvas, 111 x 150 cm., Kunstmuseum Basel

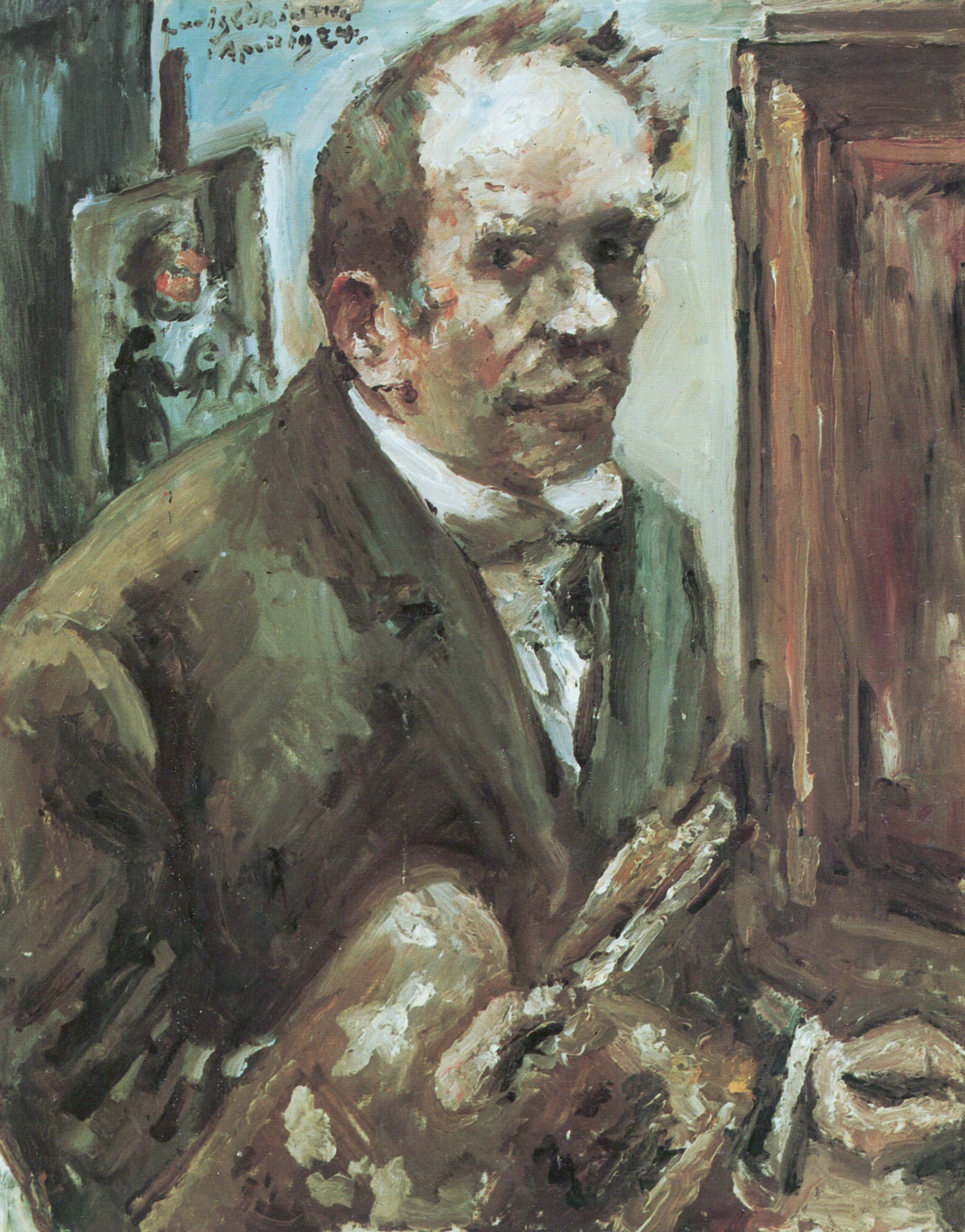
Self-portrait with Palette (1924), oil on canvas, 100 x 79 cm., Museum of Modern Art, New York

History painting

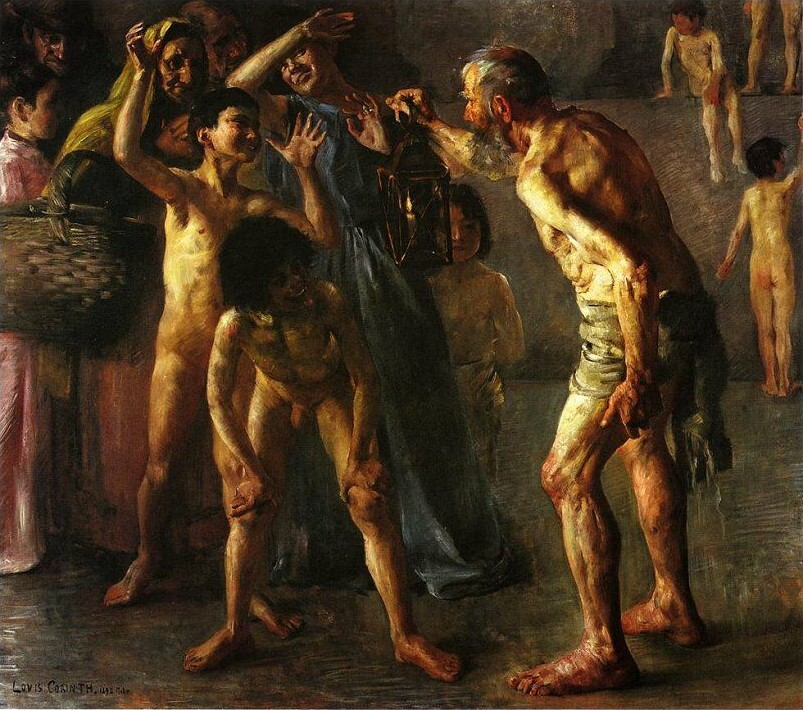
Diogenes (1892), oil on canvas, 178 x 208 cm., Ostdeutsche Galerie, Regensburg

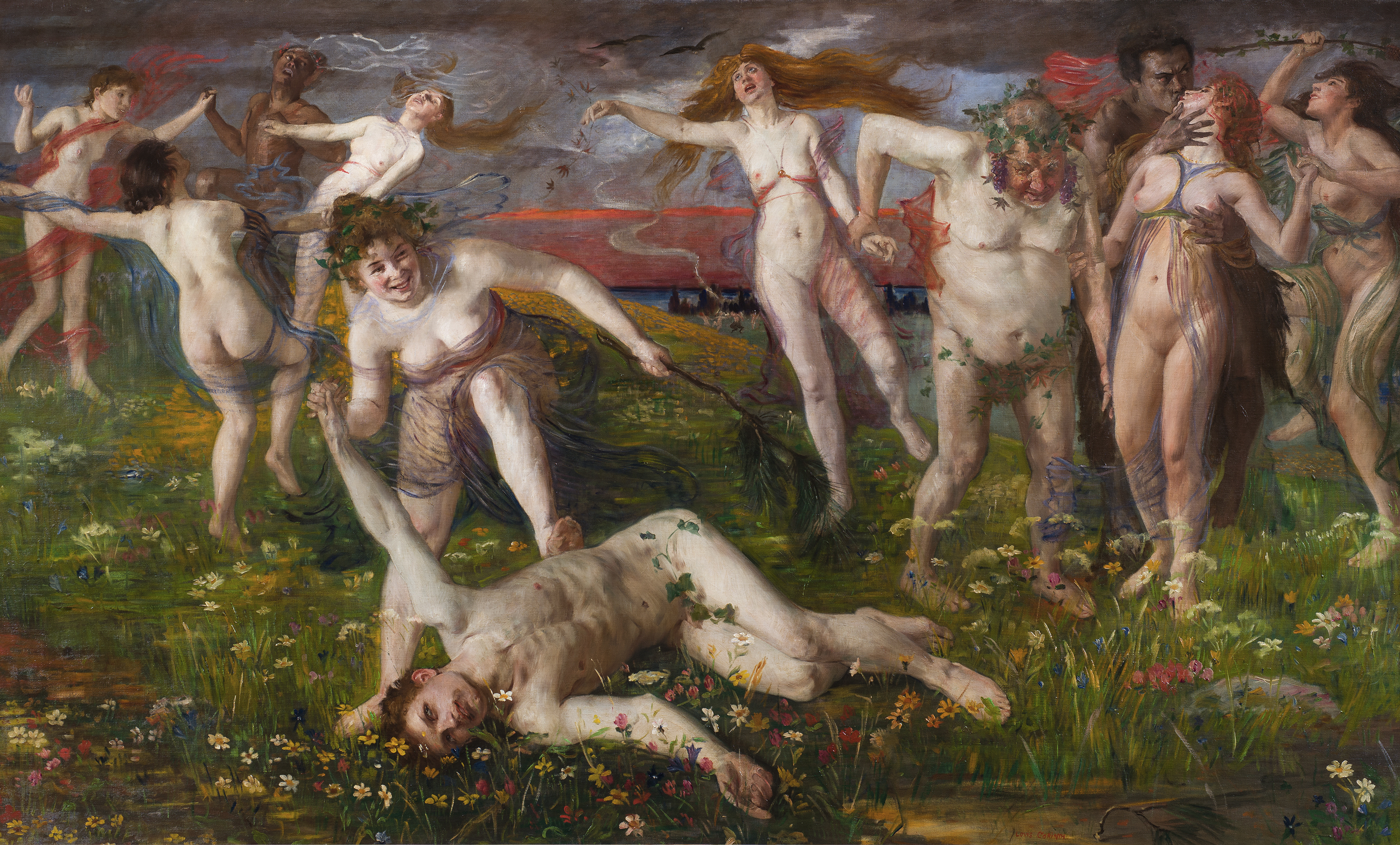
Bacchanalia (1896), oil on canvas, 117 x 204 cm., private collection

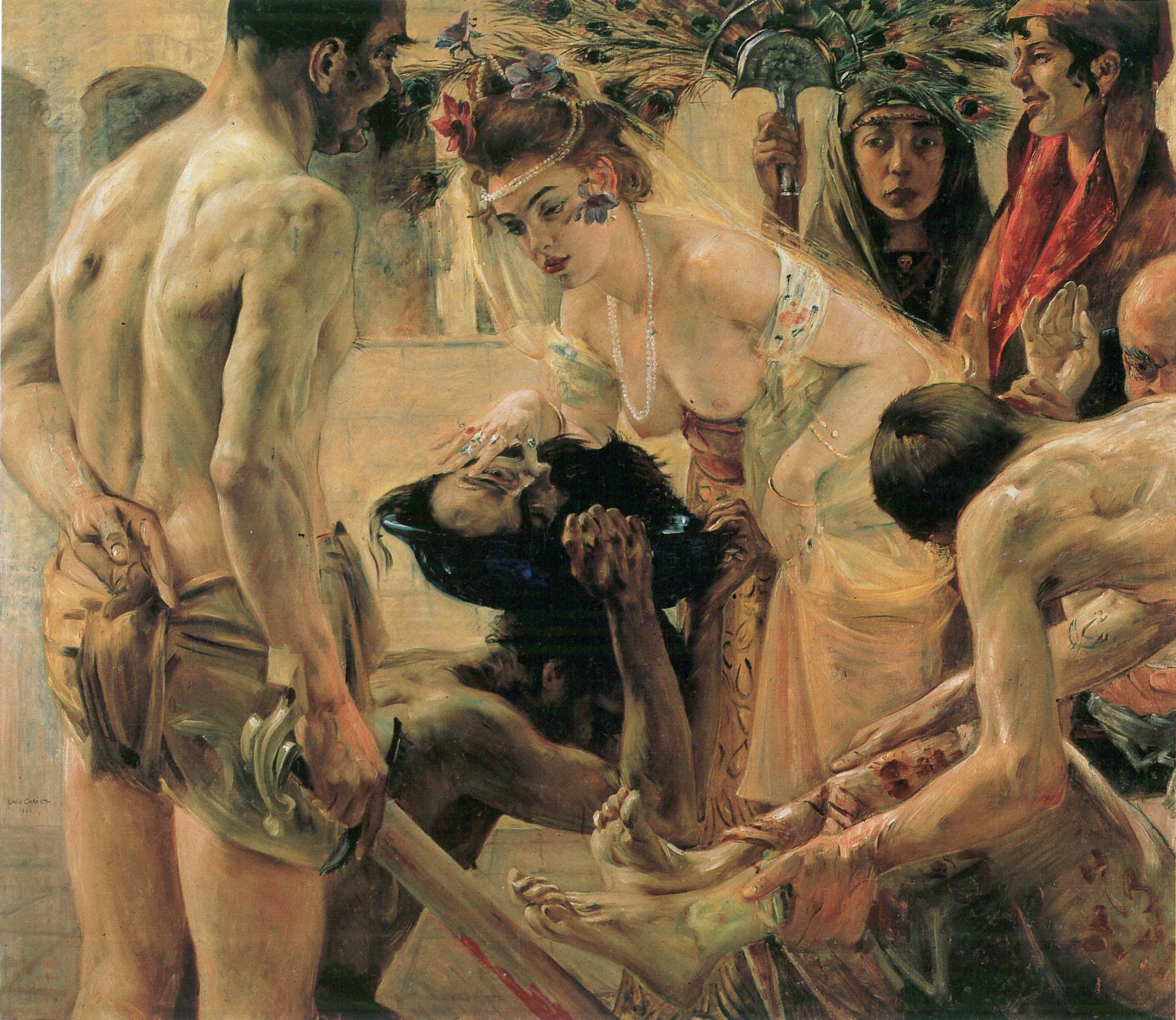
Salome (1900), oil on canvas, 127 × 147 cm., Museum der Bildenden Künste Leipzig

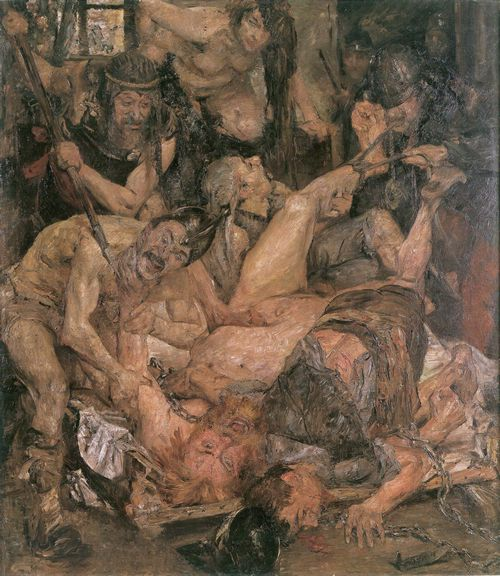
The Capture of Samson (1907), oil on canvas, 200 x 174 cm., Landesmuseum Mainz

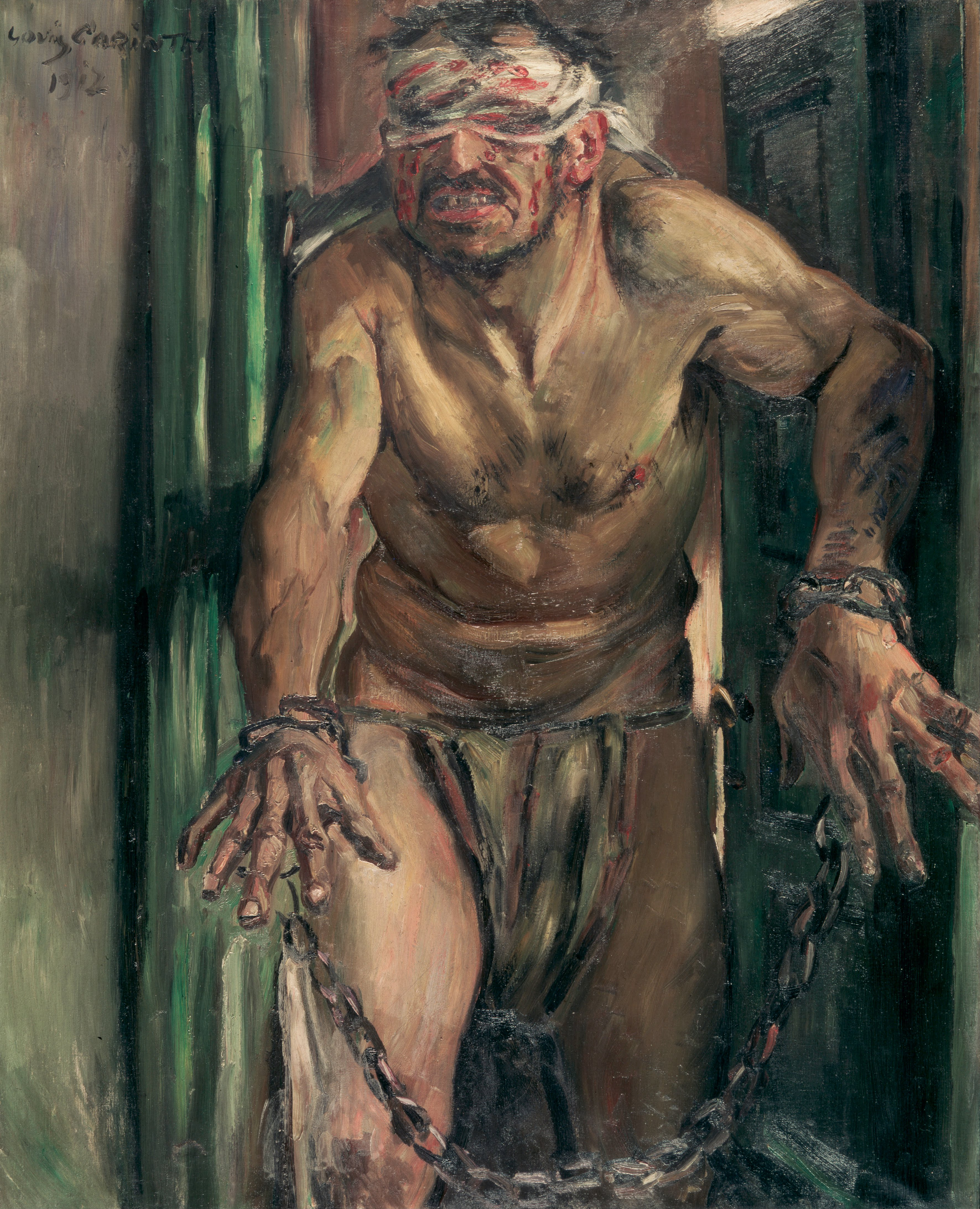
The Blinded Samson (1912), oil on canvas, 105 cm x 130 cm., Alte Nationalgalerie, Berlin

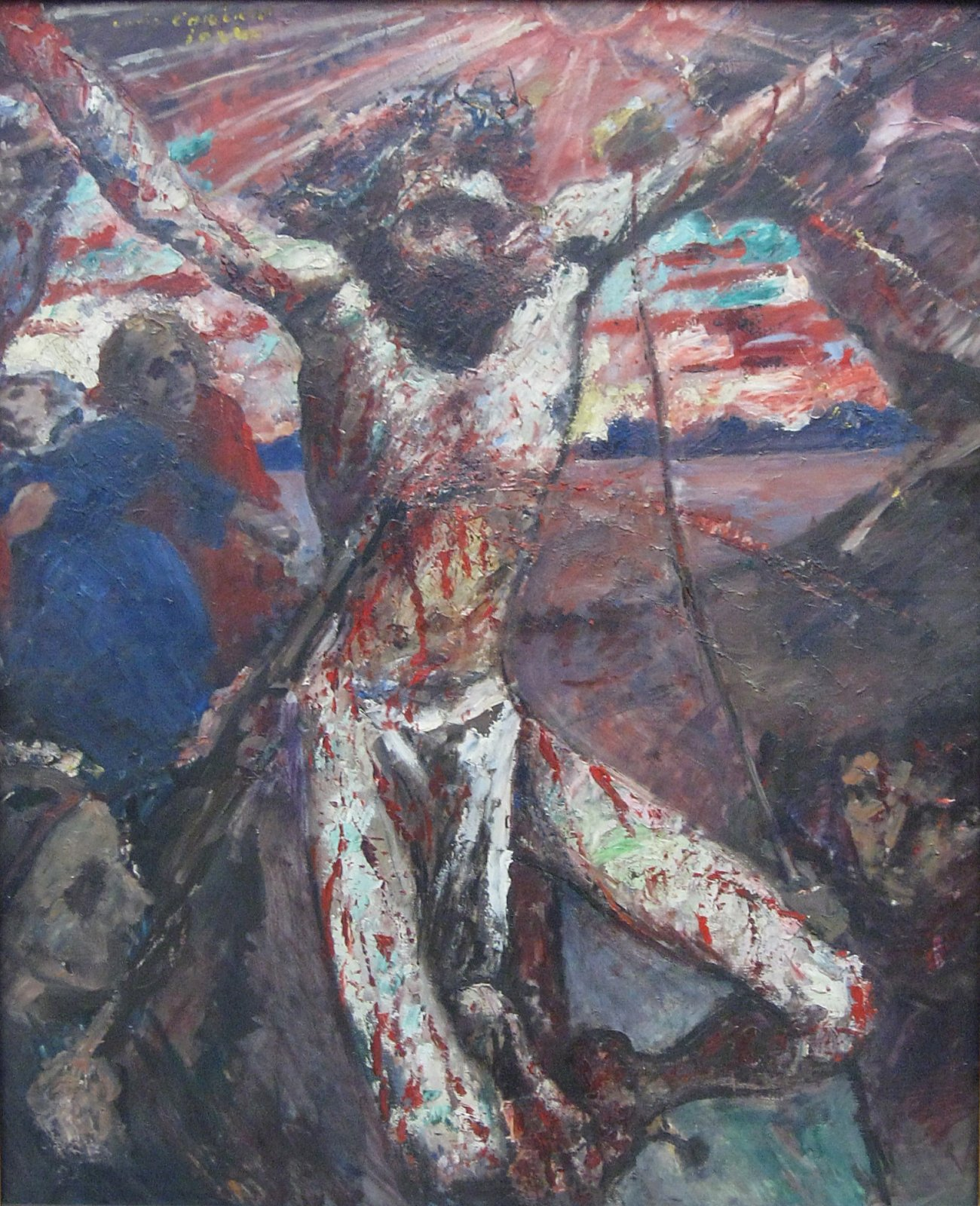
The Red Christ (1922), oil on panel, 129 x 108 cm., Pinakothek der Moderne, Munich

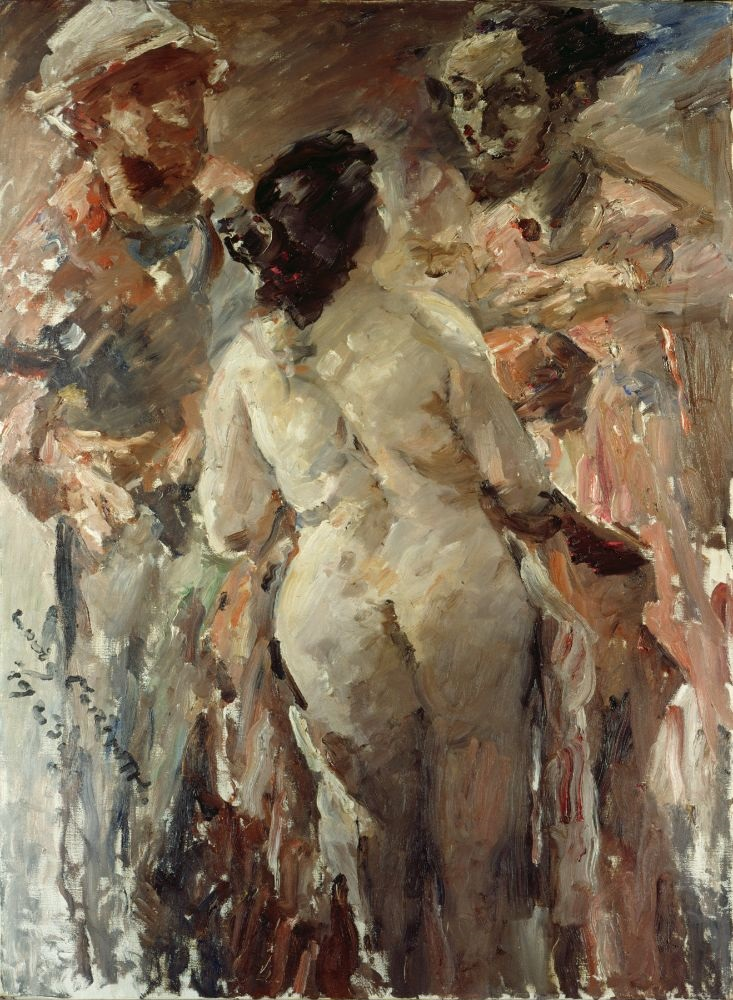
Susanna and the Elders (1923), oil on canvas, 150.5 x 111 cm., Lower Saxony State Museum

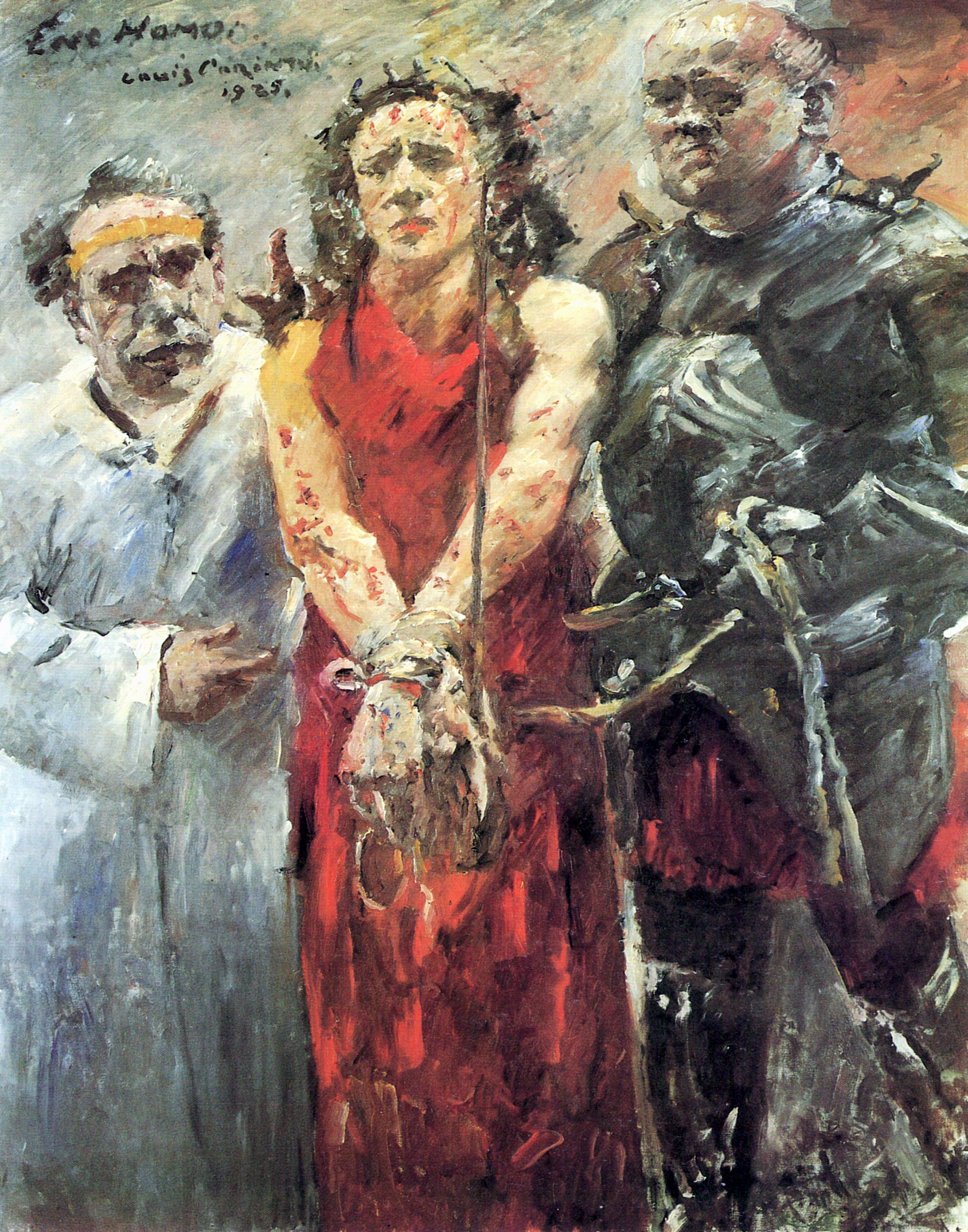
Ecce Homo (1925), oil on canvas, Kunstmuseum Basel

== See also ==
- List of German painters
- Degenerate art
- Porträt des Ohm Friedrich Corinth
