= Lõvi =

Lõvi is an Estonian surname. Notable people with the surname include:

- Oskar Lõvi (agronomist), (1892–1977), Estonian agronomist, businessman and writer
- Oskar Lõvi (journalist), Estonian journalist and politician
