= George Lovi =

George Lovi (14 August 1939 – 18 February 1993) was a Hungarian-American astronomical cartographer well-known for his column, "Rambling through the skies", in Sky & Telescope (1969 until his death).

== Works ==
- Lovi, George; Tirion, Wil (1989). Men, Monsters, and the Modern Universe. Richmond, VA: Willmann-Bell. ISBN 0-943396-24-7.
