= Lavis (surname) =

Lavis is a surname. Notable people with the surname include:

- Arthur Lavis (1924–1999), British cinematographer
- Beatrice Lavis Cuming
- Fred Lavis (January 8, 1871 – November 24, 1950), American construction engineer
- George Lavis (17 August 1908 – 29 July 1956), Welsh cricketer
- Gilson Lavis (1951–2025), English drummer of Squeeze
- John Lavis (born 1965), Canadian physician
- Luke D. Lavis, American chemist
- Neale Lavis (1930–2019), Australian equestrian
- Sidney Lavis (1873–1965), English Anglican clergyman

== See also ==
- Lavis, municipality in Italy
- Lavi (disambiguation)
- Laves (disambiguation)
- Lavies, a surname
- "Lavish", a 2024 song
- Lavy, a surname
- Levies (disambiguation)
- Levis (disambiguation)
