= Lavie =

Lavie or Lavié or variant, may refer to:

== People ==
=== Given name ===
- Lavie Tidhar (born 1976), Israeli-born writer

=== Family name ===
- Arik Lavie (1927–2004), Israeli pop-rock-folk singer and actor
- Colin LaVie (born 1962), Canadian politician
- Lisa Lavie, Canadian singer-songwriter
- Miguel Lavié (born 1986), Uruguayan soccer player
- Nilli Lavie, Israeli-British academic, psychologist, and neuroscientist
- Oren Lavie (born 1976), Israeli singer, songwriter, playwright and theatre director
- Peretz Lavie (born 1949), Israeli academic in the psychophysiology of sleep and sleep disorders
- Raffi Lavie (1937–2007), Israeli artist, art educator, and music and art critic
- Raúl Lavié (born 1937), Argentinian entertainer
- Ricardo Lavié (1923–2010), Argentinian actor
- Smadar Lavie (fl. 1991–2020), Israeli anthropologist and author
- Ted Lavie (born 1986), French football player

=== Characters ===
- Lavie Head, a character from the 2003 anime series Last Exile

== Other uses ==
- Lavié, Lavié-Agoviépé, Togo
- Lavie (automobile), a former French automobile

== See also ==
- Lavies, a surname
- Lavi (disambiguation)
- La vie (disambiguation)
- Vie (disambiguation)
- C'est la vie (disambiguation)
- Lavy, a surname
