= The Spectacular Now (soundtrack) =

2013 film soundtrack album

The Spectacular Now (Original Motion Picture Soundtrack)

Soundtrack album by Rob Simonsen and various artists
- Released: July 30, 2013
- Recorded: 2012–2013
- Genres: Film score; film soundtrack
- Length: 64:43
- Label: Lakeshore
- Producer: Rob Simonsen

Rob Simonsen chronology
Girl Most Likely (2013)	The Spectacular Now (2013)	Chu and Blossom (2014)

The Spectacular Now (More Music from the Motion Picture)

Soundtrack album by various artists
- Released: August 20, 2013
- Genre: Film soundtrack
- Length: 30:13
- Label: Lakeshore

The Spectacular Now (Original Motion Picture Soundtrack) is the soundtrack album to the 2013 film The Spectacular Now directed by James Ponsoldt and starred Miles Teller and Shailene Woodley. The film score is composed by Rob Simonsen and the soundtrack accompanying his score and three of the songs featured in the film was released through Lakeshore Records on July 30, 2013. The Spectacular Now (More Music from the Motion Picture) is the second album that featured more additional songs as heard in the film, and was released through Lakeshore Records on August 20, 2013.

== Development ==
Rob Simonsen composed the music for The Spectacular Now. While he was also involved in another coming-of-age romantic comedy The Way, Way Back, Simonsen considered this to be a much darker and melancholic film than the former, despite being heartwarming, as it focused on teenage alcoholism, detachment from parents and self-esteem issues, which was much different from the teen comedies in the 1980s and it focused on a broader and pervasive habit of self-examination, which was shown in the complexities and psyches of the characters as well.

In the film, Sutter was a broadly likeable and outgoing character, and the music needed to get out of the way and create a cocoon around the transformation he undergoes through the course of the film, which was more spatial and textural rather than thematic, while focusing on the emotional conflicts of Sutter's internal world and the teenage romance, but also reaches outward to provide a fabric of tone of mood. The opening titles begin with a fun jazz brass piece which stemmed out from Ponsoldt's idea, when discussed about "drunken high school marching band" kind of vibe early on approached with that insight to provide Sutter an energy reminiscent of Bob Dylan and Tom Waits, where the whole opening scene revolves around him glorifying his past and himself, until he meets Amy, his life changes. Sutter's romantic relationship with Amy was considered relatable, where in a sequence both share a kiss while walking in the woods, it provided all the good emotions in a relationship.

The instrumentation for The Spectacular Now featured an ethereal tone, where Simonsen used mangled samples, whirlies, glock, harp harmonics, guitars, synths, bass and drums as well as reverbs and tape emulations. He further wanted to mix the 5.1 surround sound of the score wider and spacious, with some cues having certain sounds going on in the two front speakers for a bit, and for a certain emotional moment that occurs, the sound started to fill up the side and rear speakers, to provide the feeling of being engulfed in the moment, being subtle and cool.

== Reception ==
Jonathan Delp of The Audio Glow stated that the soundtrack "perfectly captures a teenage memory in the making". Katy Vans of Blueprint wrote "the soundtrack full of tracks composed by Rob Simonsen is a whimsical journey of mellow loveliness." Jake Wilson of The Sydney Morning Herald wrote "Rob Simonsen's ambient score evokes a dreamy adolescent sense of marking time". Richard Propes of The Independent Critic wrote "Rob Simonsen's original music companions both the film and the soundtrack quite nicely". Jason Sandford of Ashvegas called it a "light but intricate score".

== Track listing ==
The Spectacular Now (Original Motion Picture Soundtrack)
No.	Title	Artist(s)	Length
1.	"My Name Is Sutter Keely"		5:19
2.	"Paper Route"		4:03
3.	"Sutter and Amy"		2:23
4.	"Amy's House"		1:21
5.	"IM'ing Cassidy"		2:13
6.	"Walk in the Trees"		2:31
7.	"Turn It Around"		1:26
8.	"Prom Flask"		2:18
9.	"I Want To Call Him"		1:51
10.	"Porch Talk"		1:45
11.	"Drive to Dad's"		0:42
12.	"I Wasn't Kicked Out, I Left"		2:12
13.	"Waiting Room"		1:33
14.	"Goodbye, Cassidy"		1:05
15.	"Leaving Her"		2:32
16.	"I'm a King"		0:46
17.	"Towards an Unknown Future"		2:43
18.	"Epictacular Then"		4:21
19.	"In the Moment"		1:47
20.	"It's in the Air"		1:26
21.	"Song for Zula"	Phosphorescent	6:08
22.	"Baby"	Ariel Pink feat. Dam-Funk	4:46
23.	"Wakin on a Pretty Daze"	Kurt Vile	9:32
Total length:			64:43

The Spectacular Now (More Music from the Motion Picture)
No.	Title	Artist(s)	Length
1.	"Live Fast, Love Hard, Die Young"	Faron Young	2:16
2.	"Go Hard"	Kutt the Check	4:26
3.	"Wild Nights"	Snake! Snake! Snakes!	3:37
4.	"New Theory"	Washed Out	2:47
5.	"Farming Man"	Tennessee River Crooks	5:33
6.	"The Riff"	Just Water	5:00
7.	"No Good with Secrets"	Saturday Looks Good to Me	3:20
8.	"Need Someone to Love"	Norma Jenkins	3:14
Total length:			30:13

== Personnel ==
Credits adapted from liner notes:

- Music composer and producer – Rob Simonsen
- Drums – Isaac Carpenter
- Guitar, bass – Christopher Wray
- Synth design – Son Lux
- Trombone – Ben Devitt, Erm Navarro
- Trumpet – James Blackwell, Walter Simonsen
- Tuba – Marc Bolin
- Recording – Michael Patterson
- Mixing – Michael Patterson, Brad Haehnel
- Score editor – Erich Stratmann
- Music supervisor – Gabe Hilfer, Season Kent
- Musical assistance – Duncan Blickenstaff
- Executive music producer – Andrew Lauren, Michelle Krumm, Shawn Levy, Tom McNulty
- Executive album producer – Brian McNelis, Skip Williamson
- A&R director – Eric Craig
- Art direction – John Bergin
- Photography – Wilford Harewood

== Accolades ==
Award	Date of ceremony	Category	Result	Ref(s)
World Soundtrack Awards	October 19, 2013	Discovery of the Year	Nominated (Note: also for The Way, Way Back)	
