= Lavinia (disambiguation) =

Lavinia was the daughter of Latinus and Amata in Roman mythology.

Lavinia may also refer to:

== Biology ==
- Lavinia (fish), a genus of cyprinid fish containing the hitches
- Eulavinia, a monotypic genus of moths formerly known as Lavinia

== People ==
- Lavinia (given name)

== Fictional characters ==
- Lavinia Andronicus, a character in Shakespeare's tragedy Titus Andronicus
- Lavinia Arguelles, a fictional character in the television series Bituing Walang Ningning
- Lavinia Herbert, a character in the novel A Little Princess
- Gargouille (comics), aka Lavinia LeBlanc, a member of the Marvel Comics Acolytes
- Lavinia Whateley, a character in the short story The Dunwich Horror
- Lavinia Mannon, a character in Eugene O'Neill's Mourning Becomes Electra
- Lavinia Richter, a character in the FX anthology series American Horror Story
- Lavinia Swire, a character in the British costume drama Downton Abbey
- Lavinia Smith, the aunt of Sarah Jane Smith who appeared in K9 and Company.
- Lavinia, a character in George Bernard Shaw's play Androcles and the Lion
- Lavinia Rafox, a character in the book The Letter for the King
- Lavinia is the name of the matron, played by Hattie Jacques in Carry On Doctor.

== Places ==
- Lavinia State Reserve, a protected area in Australia
- Lavínia, São Paulo, Brazil
- Lavinia, Iowa, United States
- Lavinia, Minnesota, United States
- Lavinia, Tennessee, United States
- Mount-Lavinia, Sri Lanka

== Other uses ==
- Lavinia (novel), a 2008 novel by Ursula K. Le Guin about the mythological Lavinia
- Lavinia (song), a 2003 single by The Veils
- HMS Lavinia, an 1806 frigate of the Royal Navy

== See also ==
- Lavenia, a list of people with the given name
- Livinia Nixon, Australian TV personality
