= Revelator =

Revelator may refer to:

- Any agent in a revelation, a deity or other supernatural entity or entities revealing or disclosing some form of truth or knowledge
- Prophet, seer, and revelator, an ecclesiastical title used in The Church of Jesus Christ of Latter-day Saints

== Music ==
- Revelator (The Amenta album), 2021
- Revelator (Elucid album), 2024
- Revelator (Phil Keaggy album), 1993
- Revelator (Tedeschi Trucks Band album), 2011
- Time (The Revelator), a 2001 album by Gillian Welch
- Revelator (Phosphorescent album), 2024
- "The Revelator", a song by Angels & Airwaves from the 2011 album Love: Part Two
- "Revelator", a song by Deafheaven from the 2025 album Lonely People with Power
- Revelator Limited, a music technology and digital distribution company

== Other ==
- "The Revelator" (Sons of Anarchy), the season 1 finale episode of Sons of Anarchy
- Guilty Gear Xrd -REVELATOR-, an update/sequel to the 2014 fighting game Guilty Gear Xrd -SIGN-
- Revelator, a 2021 Southern Gothic novel by Daryl Gregory
- Revelator Coffee, a coffee company

== See also ==
- John the Revelator (disambiguation)
