= La Viña =

La Viña, or La Vina, may refer to:

== Places ==
- La Vina, California, US
- La Viña, Catamarca, Argentina
- La Viña Department, Salta, Argentina
  - La Viña, Salta, Argentina

== People ==
- Antonio La Viña (born 1959), Filipino lawyer, educator, and environmental policy expert
- Josephine de la Viña (1946–2011), Filipino discus thrower

== See also ==
- Lavina (disambiguation)
