= Lavina =

Lavina may refer to:

- Lavina (given name)
- Lavina, California, former name of La Vina, California
- Lavina, Montana, United States
- Lavina, Rezzo, a village of Liguria, Italy
- Ferran Laviña, Spanish basketball player
- Lavina Fielding Anderson (born 1944), Latter Day Saint scholar, writer, editor, and feminist
- Lavina Dawson (1937–2015), writer and stage producer; see A Christmas Held Captive
- The Czech name for the 1946 film The Avalanche
- Lavina (band), a Serbian progressive metal band

== See also ==
- La Viña (disambiguation)
- Lavena (disambiguation)
- Lavenia (disambiguation)
