= C'est la vie =

C'est la vie most often refers to:

- C'est la vie (phrase), a French phrase, translated as "That's life"

C'est la vie may also refer to:

== Books ==
- C'est la Vie (comic strip), an English-language comic strip by Jennifer Babcock
- C'est la Vie, a 2004 memoir by Suzy Gershman

== Film, television, and radio ==
- C'est la vie (1980 film), or That's Life, a French film directed by Paul Vecchiali
- C'est la vie (1990 film), or La Baule-les-Pins, a French film directed by Diane Kurys
- C'est la Vie, a 2001 French film starring Sandrine Bonnaire
- C'est la vie! (2017 film), or Le Sens de la fête, a French film directed by Éric Toledano and Olivier Nakache
- C'est La Vie (TV series), a 2003 Mauritian series
- "C'est la Vie", a 1967 musical review aired as an episode of ABC Stage 67
- C'est la vie (radio), a 1998–2015 Canadian English-language radio program

== Music ==
=== Albums ===
- C'est la Vie (Despina Vandi album), or the title song, 2010
- C'est la Vie (Henri Dikongué album), 1997
- C'est la vie (J. C. Schütz album), or the title song, 2009
- C'est la vie (Khaled album), or the title song (see below), 2012
- C'est la Vie (Martin Solveig album), or the title song (see below), 2008
- C'est La Vie (Phosphorescent album), 2018
- C'est la Vie (Polara album), 1997
- C'est La Vie (Rouge album), 2003
- C'est la Vie, by Alex Fox, 1997
- C'est la Vie, by B*Witched, or the title song (see below), 2006
- C'est la Vie, by Chyi Yu, 1999
- C'est la V, by Vanness Wu, 2011

=== Songs ===
- "C'est la Vie" (Alisa Mizuki song), 2005
- "C'est la Vie" (B*Witched song), 1998
- "C'est la vie" (Carson, Hanson and Malmkvist song), 2004
- "C'est la vie" (Claude song), 2025
- "C'est la vie" (Khaled song), 2012
- "C'est la Vie" (Martin Solveig song), 2008
- "C'est la Vie" (Robbie Nevil song), 1986; originally recorded by Beau Williams (see below)
- "C'est la Vie" (Stereophonics song), 2015
- "C'est la vie" (Sarah Vaughan song), 1955
- "C'est la Vie (Always 21)", by Ace of Base, 1999
- "(And Now the Waltz) C'est La Vie", by Slade, 1982
- "You Never Can Tell" (song), by Chuck Berry, also covered by Emmylou Harris as "C'est la Vie"
- "C'est la Vie", by Anna Puu, a contestant on the Finnish TV show Idols, 2009
- "C'est la Vie", by Ayaka Komatsu, as the fictional character Sailor Venus in the television series Pretty Guardian Sailor Moon, 2003
- "C'est la Vie", by Beau Williams, 1984
- "C'est la vie", by Bobby Bazini, 2016
- "C'est la vie", by Böhse Onkelz from Ein böses Märchen, 2000
- "C'est la vie", by Booba, 2012
- "C'est la vie", by Charlene Tilton, 1984
- "C'est la vie", by Colonia, 2003
- "C'est la Vie", by Emerson, Lake & Palmer from Works Volume 1, 1977
- "C'est la vie", by Fish Leong from j'Adore, 2007
- "C'est la vie", by Gilli, 2015
- "C'est La Vie", by Gotthard from Bang!, 2014
- "C'est la vie!", by Hitomi Shimatani from Gate~scena III~, 2003
- "C'est la vie", by Hubert Kah, 1995
- "C'est la Vie", by Jean Michel Jarre from Métamorphoses, 2000
- "C'est la Vie", by the Killers from the deluxe edition of Imploding the Mirage, 2021
- "C'est la Vie", by Kim English from My Destiny, 2006
- "C'est la Vie", by L'Arc-en-Ciel from Heavenly, 1995
- "C'est La Vie", by La Toya Jackson from Startin' Over, 2002 (promo release)
- "C'est la Vie", by Lou Bega and Edvin Marton, 2006
- "C'est La Vie", by Magnum from Wings of Heaven, 1988
- "C'est la vie", by Marc Lavoine from Les Amours du dimanche, 1989
- "C'est La Vie", by Mika, 2023
- "C'est La Vie", by Protest the Hero from Scurrilous, 2011
- "C'est la vie", by Shania Twain from Up!, 2002
- "C'est La Vie", by Slash from 4, 2022
- "C'est La Vie", by Tinashe from Nightride, 2016
- "C'est la vie", by Trix, 1981
- "C'est La Vie", by UB40 from Promises and Lies, 1993
- "C'est La Vie", by Vanessa Carlton from Harmonium, 2004
- "C'est La Vie", by Vitas, 2011
- "C'est La Vie", by Yngwie Malmsteen from Fire and Ice, 1992
- "C'est La Vie", by Yung Gravy with bbno$ and Rich Brian, 2022
- "C'est La Vie", by Zoë, 2018
- "C'est la Vie", an ABBA parody in the television series French and Saunders, 2005
- "C'est la Vie (Paryż z pocztówki)", by Andrzej Zaucha, 1987
- "C'est la Vie (Say The Casualties!)", by Neon Indian from Vega Intl. Night School, 2015
- "C'est La Vie (Simera)", by Despina Vandi from 10 Hronia Mazi, 2007
- "Say La V", by Joe Nichols, 2026

== See also ==
- Shit Happens
- "Sing C'est la Vie", a song by Sonny & Cher from Look at Us
- C'est ça, la vie, German educational TV show
- Such Is Life (disambiguation)
- That's Life (disambiguation)
- La vie (disambiguation)
- Vie (disambiguation)
