= Así es la vida =

Así es la vida may refer to:

== Film ==
- Así es la vida (1930 film) or Thus Is Life, an American Spanish-language romantic comedy
- Así es la vida (1939 film) or Such Is Life, an Argentine melodrama
- Así es la vida (1977 film) or Such Is Life, an Argentine film directed by Enrique Carreras
- Así es la vida (2000 film) or Such Is Life, a Mexican drama

== Music ==
- "Así es la Vida", a 1994 song by Luis Enrique
- "Asi es la Vida" (Enrique Iglesias and María Becerra song), 2023
- "Así es la Vida", a 2002 song by Olga Tañón from Sobrevivir

== See also ==
- "La Vida es Así", a 2010 song by Ivy Queen
- C'est la vie (disambiguation)
- Such Is Life (disambiguation)
