= Lavin (disambiguation) =

Lavin is a municipality in Switzerland.

Lavin may also refer to:

- Lavin (surname)
- Lavin, Iran, a village in West Azerbaijan Province
- Lavin railway station, a Rhaetian Railway station in Lavin, Switzerland
- Ben Lavin Nature Reserve, South Africa
- Lavin Skee, Marvel Comics character

== See also ==
- Lavi (disambiguation)
- Lavinia (disambiguation)
