= 2019–20 Coppa Italia Dilettanti Regional Cups =

Italian football competition

The 2019–20 Coppa Italia Dilettanti Regional Cups make up the qualifying competition to decide which teams take part in the main competition from the group stage. Each region of Italy has a regional cup. The winners of each regional cup qualify for the group stage. This is the list of the regional cups' finals.

== Leagues ==
=== Abruzzo ===
The 18 teams of 2019–20 Eccellenza Abruzzo participated. In the second round is played between a group of three teams, the three winners of the ties of first round. The winner of this group participates in the semifinal. All competitions are two-legged, except for the final. The matches within the second round are single-legged.

12 February 2020 Final	Castelnuovo Vomano (5)	1–1 (4–5 p)	Castelnuovo Vomano (5)	Teramo

=== Apulia ===
The 16 teams of 2019–20 Eccellenza Apulia participated. The tournament is entirely knockout. All ties are two-legged, including the final.

23 January 2020 Final; First leg	Corato (5)	0−0	Atletico Vieste (5)	Picerno

6 February 2020 Final; Second leg	Vieste (5)	1–3 (1–3 agg.)	Corato (5)	Vieste

=== Basilicata ===
The 16 teams of Eccellenza Basilicata participated. The tournament is entirely knockout. All ties are two-legged, except the final.

2 January 2020 Final	Vultur (5)	2–0	Lavello (5)	Rionero in Vulture

=== Calabria ===
The 16 teams of Eccellenza Calabria and the 32 Eccellenza Calabria teams participated. The 48 teams are divided into 16 groups of three. The winners of each group qualify for the knock-out stage. All ties are single-legged, except the semi-finals.

21 December 2019 Final	Morrone (5)	1–1 (3–5 p)	San Luca (5)	Cosenza

=== Campania ===
The 36 teams of Eccellenza Campania participated. The teams are divided into 12 groups of three. Group winners and top 4 runners-up qualify for the knock-out stage. All ties are two-legged, except the final.

29 January 2020 Final	Afragolese (5)	1–0	Costa d'Amalfi (5)	Sarno

=== Emilia-Romagna ===
The 36 teams of Eccellenza Emilia-Romagna participated. The teams are divided into 12 groups of three. The winners of the 12 groups are divided into four further groups of three. The winners of the second group stage qualify for the knockout stage, consisting of the semi-finals and the final. The semi-finals are two-legged, and the final is single-legged.

22 January 2020 Final	Virtus Castelfranco (5)	3–2 (a.e.t.)	Sant'Agostino (5)	Castelvetro di Modena

=== Friuli-Venezia Giulia ===
The 16 teams of Eccellenza Friuli-Venezia Giulia participated. The tournament is entirely knockout. All ties are two-legged, except for the final. For two-legged matches, the away goals rule does not apply.

5 January 2020 Final	Manzanese (5)	1–0	Torviscosa (5)	Torviscosa

=== Lazio ===
The 36 teams of Eccellenza Lazio participated. Eight teams play in a preliminary round. The winners of that round and the 28 teams that received a bye for the previous round enter the round of 32. All matches are two-legged, except the final.

5 February 2020 Final	Real Monterotondo Scalo (5)	2−1	Villalba Ocres Moca (5)	Ladispoli

=== Liguria ===
The 16 teams of Eccellenza Liguria participated. The 16 teams are divided into four groups of four. The group winners qualify for the knock-out stage. The semi-finals are two-legged; the final is single-legged.

6 January 2020 Final	Sestri Levante (5)	2–1	Albenga (5)	Genoa

=== Lombardy ===
The 48 teams of Eccellenza Lombardy participated. The 48 teams are divided into 16 groups of three. The group winners qualify for the knock-out stage. All matches are single-legged.

21 December 2019 Final	Valcalepio (5)	0–1	Casatese (5)	Almenno San Salvatore

=== Marche ===
The 16 teams of Eccellenza Marche participated. The tournament is entirely knockout. All matches are two-legged, except the final which is single-legged.

15 January 2020 Final	Forsempronese (5)	2−1	Porto d'Ascoli (5)	Romagna

=== Molise ===
The 16 teams of Eccellenza Molise participated. The tournament is entirely knockout. All matches are two-legged, except the final which is single-legged.

2 February 2020 Final	Campodipietra (5)	0–4	Tre Pini Matese (5)	Campodipietra

=== Piedmont/Aosta Valley ===
The 32 teams of Eccellenza Piedmont/Aosta Valley participated. The tournament is entirely knockout. All matches are two-legged, except the final which is single-legged.

5 February 2020 Final	Chisola (5)	2–1 (a.e.t.)	Città di Baveno (5)	Granozzo con Monticello

=== Sardinia ===
The 16 teams Eccellenza Sardinia participated. The tournament is entirely knockout. All matches are two-legged, except the final which is single-legged.

8 February 2020 Final	Carbonia (5)	1−0	Atletico Uri (5)	Carbonia

=== Sicily ===
The 32 teams of Eccellenza Sicily participated. The tournament is entirely knockout. All matches are two-legged, except the final which is single-legged.

22 January 2020 Final	San Cataldese (5)	0–0 (a.e.t.) (4–5 p)	Giarre (5)	Favara

=== Tuscany ===
The 32 teams of Eccellenza Tuscany participated. The tournament is entirely knockout. All matches are single-legged, except the round of 32 which is two-legged.

8 January 2020 Final	San Marco Avenza (5)	2–1	Badesse (5)	Florence

=== Trentino-Alto Adige/Südtirol ===
The 48 teams of Eccellenza Trentino-Alto Adige/Südtirol participated. The tournament is divided into two paths. The path of the province of Trento and that of the province of Bolzano. The path of Bolzano includes 24 teams divided into eight groups of three. Group stage winners qualify for the knock-out stage, starting with the round of 16. All ties are single-legged. The Trentino path include 24 teams divided into six groups of four. The group winners and the best two runners-up qualify for the knock-out stage. The quarterfinals and semi-finals are two-leg while the final is single-legged. The winners of the Trentino path and the Bolzano path qualify for the regional final of the tournament.

14 December 2019 Final	Trento (5)	2–0	Sankt Georgen (5)	Lavies

=== Umbria ===
The 16 teams of Eccellenza Umbria participated. The 16 teams are divided into four groups of four. The group winners qualify for the knock-out stage. The semi-finals are two-legged while the final is single-legged.

13 November 2019 Final	Ducato Spoleto (5)	2–2 (7–8 p)	Tiferno Lerchi 1919 (5)	Foligno

=== Veneto ===
The 32 teams of Eccellenza Veneto participated. The 32 teams are divided into eight groups of four. The group winners qualify for the knock-out stage. The semi-finals are two-legged while the quarter-finals and final are a single-legged.

6 January 2020 Final	Sandonà 1922 (5)	1–0	Garda (5)	Rovigo
