= Vie =

Vie or VIE may refer to:

== Places ==
- Vie, Oradea, Romania
- Vie (river), a river in western France
- Vie (Dives), a tributary of the Dives river in France
- Vietnam (IOC country code)

== Arts and entertainment ==
- Vie (album), by Doja Cat, 2025
- Vie, an album by Johnny Hallyday, 1970
- Vie (cards), a term in card games
- Vance Integral Edition, the complete works of author Jack Vance
- Virgin Interactive Entertainment, a video game publisher

== Other uses ==
- Vacuum insulated evaporator, a cryogenic storage pressure vessel
- Variable interest entity, a type of legal entity in finance and investment
- Vienna International Airport, Austria (IATA code)
- Vietnamese language (ISO 639-2 code)

== See also ==
- Lavie (disambiguation)
- La vie (disambiguation)
- C'est la vie (disambiguation)
