= Peter wirtzi =

Conservation status
- Least Concern (IUCN 3.1)

Scientific classification
- Kingdom: Animalia
- Phylum: Chordata
- Class: Actinopterygii
- Order: Gobiiformes
- Family: Gobiidae
- Genus: Peter
- Species: P. wirtzi

Binomial name
- Peter wirtzi (Kovacic & Schliewen, 2008)

Synonyms
- Didogobius wirtzi

Species of fish

Peter wirtzi is a species of marine fish in the family Gobiidae, the gobies. It is endemic to Cape Verde, where it occurs at depths from 15 to 25 m (50 to 80 ft). The species was first described by Kovačić and Schliewen in 2008.

== Description ==
The fish grows to maximum 3 cm (1.2 in) length.

== Etymology ==
Both the genus and specific names honour Peter Wirtz, a marine biologist at the University of Madeira who collected the types of this species and Peter amicuscaridis, as well as numerous other Gobiiformes. His collection is now housed in the Zoologische Staatssammlung München in Munich.
