= Peter (fish) =

Scientific classification
- Kingdom: Animalia
- Phylum: Chordata
- Class: Actinopterygii
- Order: Gobiiformes
- Family: Gobiidae
- Subfamily: Gobiinae
- Genus: Peter; Schliewen, 2023

Type species
- Didogobius wirtzi Schliewen & Kovačić, 2008

Genus of fishes

Peter is a genus of small marine fish in the subfamily Gobiinae, the true gobies. They are native to the eastern Atlantic Ocean where they occur around the coasts of Senegal and the island nations of São Tomé and Principe and Cape Verde Islands. The name honours two marine biologists called Peter - Peter Wirtz and Peter J. Miller. Both species form symbiotic relationships with burrowing shrimps, and were formerly allocated to genus Didogobius

== Species ==
There are two recognized species in this genus:

- Peter amicuscaridis Schliewen & Kovačić, 2008
- Peter wirtzi Schliewen & Kovačić, 2008
