= Here's to Taking It Easy =

Studio album by Phosphorescent
- Released: May 11, 2010
- Genres: Indie, Americana
- Length: 44:20
- Label: Dead Oceans

Phosphorescent chronology
To Willie (2009)	Here's to Taking It Easy (2010)	Muchacho (2013)

Professional ratings
Review scores
Source	Rating
AllMusic	3.5/5 stars
Consequence of Sound	4.5/5 stars
Filter	(86/100)
Pitchfork Media	(8.2/10)
PopMatters	(7/10)
Spectrum Culture	(2.5/5.0)

Here's to Taking It Easy is the fifth full-length album by Phosphorescent. It is his third on the Dead Oceans label. It was released on May 11, 2010.

== Track listing ==
1. "It's Hard to Be Humble (When You're from Alabama)" - 4:28
2. "Nothing Was Stolen (Love Me Foolishly)" - 4:49
3. "We'll Be Here Soon" - 3:17
4. "The Mermaid Parade" - 4:22
5. "I Don't Care if There's Cursing" - 4:55
6. "Tell Me Baby (Have You Had Enough)" - 4:37
7. "Hej, Me I'm Light" - 4:38
8. "Heaven, Sittin' Down" - 4:26
9. "Los Angeles" - 8:48

== Charts ==
Chart (2010)	Peak position
UK Independent Albums Chart	27
UK Indie Breakers Albums Chart	7
US Heatseekers Albums	8
US Independent Albums	47
US Folk Albums	14
