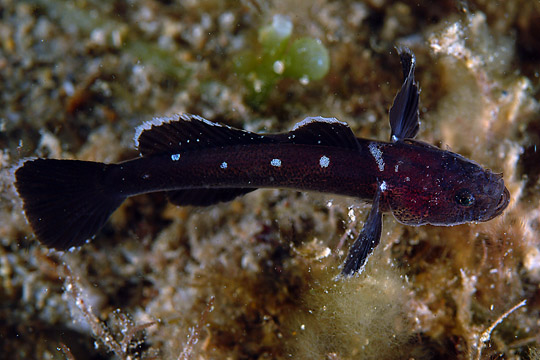

Conservation status
- Least Concern (IUCN 3.1)

Scientific classification
- Kingdom: Animalia
- Phylum: Chordata
- Class: Actinopterygii
- Order: Gobiiformes
- Family: Gobiidae
- Genus: Didogobius
- Species: D. schlieweni

Binomial name
- Didogobius schlieweni P. J. Miller, 1993

= Didogobius schlieweni =

Species of fish

Didogobius schlieweni is a species of goby native to the Adriatic Sea. The specific name honours the German ichthyologist Ulrich Schliewen of the Zoologische Staatssammlung München in Munich, the collector of the type and who suggested that the species be given the common name Andromeda Goby referring to the "nebula-like pattern of light and dark markings".
