= Lavi (disambiguation) =

Lavi is a kibbutz in northern Israel.

Lavi may also refer to:

- Lavi (name)
- Lavi (D.Gray-man), a manga and anime character
- Lavi, Estonia, a village
- Lavi language, spoken in Laos
- Left atrial volume index (LAVI), in medicine
- IAI Lavi, an Israeli fighter aircraft

== See also ==
- General Motors LAV I (LAV 1) wheeled light armoured vehicle
- lav (disambiguation)
- Lavie (disambiguation)
- Lavin (disambiguation)
- Levi (disambiguation)
- Livi (disambiguation)
- Lovi (disambiguation)
