= Harry Shokler =

American painter (1896–1978)

- Harry Shokler, photo from the Brooklyn Daily Eagle (February 26, 1947, p. 6)
- Born: April 27, 1896; Cincinnati, Ohio
- Died: September 28, 1978 (aged 82); Hanover, New Hampshire
- Resting place: Montefiore Cemetery, Price Hill, Cincinnati, Ohio

Harry Shokler (1896–1978) was a 20th-century American artist known for his oil paintings and screen prints. Using a realist approach that produced what one critic called an "exactness of rendition", he made colorful landscapes, cityscapes, and marine scenes as well as some notable portraits. He helped pioneer silkscreen printmaking in the 1930s and wrote an influential guide explaining and demonstrating the method. He gave few solo or small group exhibitions in commercial galleries and showed his work mainly from his own studio and in non-profit venues.

While critics praised him for skillful depiction of his subjects, they did not credit him with stylistic individuality or skill in reshaping natural subjects to achieve emotional expression. Early in his career critics called his work "simple, direct, and sincere." Of his mature work others used terms like "quaint", "convincing", "capable", "truthfully realistic", and "honest". In 1939, Howard Devree of the New York Times wrote: "Shokler's work is quiet and unostentatious, possesses a real feeling, and combines a rather traditional approach with modern vigor and spirit."

== Early life and training ==
Shokler was born in Cincinnati on April 27, 1896. He graduated from the city's Woodward High School in June 1914 and subsequently enrolled in the Cincinnati Art Academy, where Frank Duveneck was an influential instructor. Based in Europe during World War I, he designed naval camouflage as an Army private and, in his spare time, sketched portraits of officers and enlisted men. After his discharge he took classes at the New York School of Fine and Applied Arts. In 1921 he returned to Cincinnati for further study at the Art Academy and to attend the summer school conducted by the Pennsylvania Academy of the Fine Arts. Shokler subsequently rented a studio in New York, where he made realist portraits of celebrities including Babe Ruth, the author Irvin S. Cobb, and a trio of acrobats called the Allison Sisters. In 1925 and 1926 he spent the summer months in the artists' colony of Provincetown, Massachusetts. During those years he also took classes at the Art Students League of New York and, in 1926, won the League's Freiburg Traveling Scholarship. Using the scholarship to travel and study in Europe, he spent 1927 taking classes at the Académie Colarossi in Paris, mixing with American artists on the coast of Brittany and painting on the Côte d'Azur. Then, having run short of cash, he lived and painted in Kairouan, Tunisia, for much of 1928. Before returning to New York in November of that year, he visited Italy, Germany, and, again, Paris.

== Career in art ==
In 1921, while he was in his second period of study at the Cincinnati Art Academy, Shokler contributed his portrait of author Irvin S. Cobb to a group show held at the Cincinnati Art Museum under the auspices of the academy's Palette and Brush Club. Three years later he showed a marine painting in an academy show of works by its former students, and in 1925 he showed landscapes and portraits in a solo exhibition at the New School for Social Research in New York. The following year he contributed to a group show held by the Society of Independent Artists in New York and was given a small solo exhibition of Provincetown landscapes and harbor views at the Woman's City Club in Cincinnati. In 1927 Traxel Gallery in Cincinnati gave him his first solo exhibition in a commercial space. At the time, a local critic said he differed from other Provincetown artists in his ability to capture the atmosphere of the place, conveying "local feeling" in a personal way. "There is," the critic wrote, "a certain repose about the representation which makes one feel that it is fundamentally the artist plus Provincetown."

Toward the end of his two-year stay in Europe and North Africa, Shokler had a painting accepted in the Paris Salon exhibition of 1928 and was given a solo exhibition in the Galerie de Marsan. Shortly after his return to the United States, the Baltimore Museum of Art gave him a solo exhibition of a few of the Provincetown paintings and many that he had made while abroad. The critical response was mixed. A critic writing in The Baltimore Sun praised his ability to depict atmosphere, particularly in his use of bright pigments to convey "the warmth of strong and almost tangible sunlight." This critic gave as an instance a work in which "the blue dusk of the Arabian evening seemingly extended outside the bounds of the frame of the canvas, to form an aura about its particular section of the gallery." In contrast, another Baltimore Sun critic said he believed Shokler was still feeling his way as an artist, had "missed the feeling and therefore the beauty of his forms." This critic said Shokler made canvases that were "largely labored things." Early in 1929 Traxel Galleries showed the European and North African paintings, and later in the year Shokler participated in a group show at the National Academy and a solo exhibition at the Three Arts Club in New York.

In the early 1930s Shokler contributed paintings to group shows in New York and Philadelphia: at the Pennsylvania Academy of Fine Arts (Philadelphia, 1930), the G.R.D. Studio (New York, 1930), the Painters and Sculptors Gallery (New York, 1932), the Artists' Co-operative Market (New York, 1932), the Hotel Brevoort (New York, 1933), the Blue Bowl restaurant (New York, 1934), and the Jumble Shop (New York, 1934).

=== Residence in Vermont ===
Early in 1934 Shokler and his wife, the author Dahris B. Martin, took a summer rental of a cottage in the village of South Londonderry, Vermont, and that fall he showed paintings of village landmarks in a group exhibition held by Southern Vermont Artists, Inc. in Manchester. A decade later they bought a house in the village and, liking the locale and its inhabitants, soon made it their permanent residence. The couple immersed themselves in local society, became active in village civic affairs, and increasingly sought ways to provide leadership in local and regional cultural activities. In 1948 Shokler began restoring a dilapidated barn on the property. Using barter to obtain the materials and labor that were needed to complete the job, he constructed a combination studio, gallery, and classroom. At first called the Barter Barn, the place eventually became known as the Shokler Art Studio. Shokler used the building's gallery to display his own works and works produced by students who came there to learn art. He also made it available as a local and regional art center, hosting meetings of art groups and displaying works by amateur and professional artists of the area.

=== Exhibitions in the 1930s ===
Harry Shokler, "Duryea's Dock, Montauk," 1939, oil on canvas, 26 x 32 inches

Harry Shokler, "Chestnut Tree, Londonderry, Vermont," 1940, oil on canvas, 26 x 32 inches

In the early 1930s Shokler worked for the New Deal Public Works of Art Project. During the second half of the decade he continued to participate in group shows in such places as the end-of-season exhibitions of Vermont artists held annually in Manchester, the periodic Municipal art exhibitions in Manhattan, and an art auction to benefit a Brooklyn section of the American Labor Party.

In 1939 the Schneider-Gabriel Galleries in New York gave Shokler a solo exhibition of twelve landscapes and harbor scenes from New Hampshire, Vermont, and Montauk. The New York Sun printed a reproduction of his painting, "Duryea's Dock, Montauk," and one of the paper's art critics, Henry McBride, praised Shokler's ability to create "exactness in rendition". He concluded, "Mr. Shokler's color is fresh and the handling is vivacious. It might be that his compositions have a tendency at times to be overcrowded, but the public in general will not object to this." "Duryea's Dock" is shown at left. When, two years later, Schneider-Gabriel gave Shokler another solo show, a critic for the New York Times singled out two oil paintings, "Chestnut Tree" and "New Jersey Landscape", for praise, writing that they showed him "at his best and a good honest best it is." A few days later the Times printed a reproduction of "Chestnut Tree." The painting is shown at right.

=== Screen printing ===
Harry Shokler, 1941, "Katherine," screen print, 12.2 x 10.7 inches

In the early 1930s a few American artists began experimenting with silk screen printing, a process then mostly used for posters, advertising, and similar applications. In 1938 one of these artists, Anthony Velonis, convinced the Graphics Section of the WPA Art Project in New York City to set up a Silk Screen Unit. With Velonis at its head, the artists in the unit were able for the first time to focus their energies on advancing silk screening as an artistic medium. Called serigraphy or screen printing, the process quickly took hold in the New York art community. In 1940 Edward Alden Jewell gave a concise description of the method. "A stopping out varnish is painted freely over a silk screen mesh," he wrote, "so that only the areas intended to receive color remain exposed. From three to thirty stencils may be prepared and properly registered with the total effect of an interesting gouache painting." Harry Sternberg, one of the artists in the WPA group, later told an interviewer, "Posters and displays for store windows were screenprinted. It was a logical thing to do, to try to make [art] prints that way. We were all looking for a way to make inexpensive color prints. Prints were selling for $5 or $10 and we needed a cheap way to make them." In an article published in 1964 Edward Landon, another member of the group, said the materials and equipment needed for serigraphy were affordable by virtually any artist. The method, he wrote, was easy to learn and any artist should be able to use it to create an edition of fine prints. At the same time it was so flexible that experienced serigraphers could make complex works of art. Shokler was a member of the Silk Screen Unit. He later told an interviewer that in 1940, when the WPA project came to an end, he and about a dozen others rented a loft in a low-rent area of Manhattan's Lower East Side, where they perfected the technique and taught it to others. The same year he also joined with former members of the unit to form an organization called the Silk Screen Group to promote and exhibit screen print works of art. In 1944 the Silk Screen Group renamed itself the National Serigraph Society. Shokler served as the society's president twice during its early years. The group ceased to exist in 1962.

Regarding a second Schneider-Gabriel solo exhibition in 1940, a critic for the New York Times said a serigraph portrait of Shokler's demonstrated that the medium could be used to produce high-quality works of art. This print, "Katherine", is shown at left. When Schneider-Gabriel gave Shokler a third solo the following year, a critic for the New York Sun said his landscape paintings were "capable" and added, "but on the whole one is inclined to think he scores his most signal successes in handling the silk screen print process." In 1942, when Grand Central Galleries showed Shokler screenprints in a solo show, A.Z. Kruse of the Brooklyn Daily Eagle called him a master of the technique and said the show was a triumph for him.

=== Late career ===
During the 1940s and until the end of his life Shokler continued to show his paintings and prints in group and solo shows. Most of these exhibitions were in his own gallery and in nonprofit organizations outside New York City, and his New York shows were mostly in the gallery of the National Serigraph Society. In 1953, when he showed landscape paintings and screen prints at the Southern Vermont Arts Center, a local critic commented on the "deep feeling for the Vermont landscape and the people who animate it" that they evidenced and on the sense of "ease and happy fulfillment" they brought out in the viewer. Regarding a small show at the Cincinnati Art Museum in 2005, a critic described a "whimsy and seeming innocence" in one of his screen prints and noted its "sophistication of technique, impeccable use of color, and keen sense of composition."

=== Artistic style ===
Harry Shokler, "July in Brooklyn," 1948, screen print, 9 x 12 inches

Harry Shokler, "Boys Fishing," 1940, oil on masonite, 18 x 22 inches

Shokler took landscapes and harbor scenes as his main subjects, but was also a skillful portraitist. He specialized in oil paintings and screen prints. Newspapers called attention to his exhibitions in lengthy reviews and more frequent short notices. Both in his lifetime and after his death, however, there was relatively little discussion of his style. Critics listed artists whose work he admired, but they rarely pointed to specific evidence of influence. In interviews, Shokler himself named artists he admired without saying they influenced his work. Critics commented on what one called "his exactness of rendition" and, as another wrote, on his freedom from "deformations". They credited him with "sincerity and seriousness" and said he combined "a rather traditional approach with modern vigor and spirit." Rather than displaying stylistic innovation, they saw his work as "truthfully realistic", which, one said, "after all is what the majority prefer." In the main, their comments on style concerned his handling of color. He was seen as essentially a colorist. In 2010 a gallery owner pointed out that "because of his colorist leanings, etchings and wood engravings never completely satisfied him. That's what led him to the experimentation with Landon that evolved into serigraphy." "July in Brooklyn," shown at left, illustrates his realist approach and colorist inclination in the silkscreen medium. "Boys Fishing," shown at right, illustrates the same in oil.

== Art teacher and author ==
In the mid-1930s, after he began spending the summer months in Vermont, Shokler led art classes for the Southern Vermont Artists Association in Manchester. Beginning in 1940, he and other artists gave screen printing classes in the low-rent New York studio space that they had rented and he began to explain and demonstrate the technique in lectures that accompanied screen print exhibitions. At the close of World War II he wrote a book that became a standard text on the subject. Entitled Artists Manual for Silk Screen Print Making, it appeared first in 1946 (New York, American Artists Group) and later in a revised edition of 1960 (New York, Tudor Publishing Co.). After he had restored the dilapidated barn on his Vermont property, he began to teach classes in its studio. In 1953 he began a stint as visiting lecturer at Columbia University and at about the same time did the same at Princeton University.

== Personal life and family ==
Harry Shokler was born in Cincinnati, Ohio, on April 25, 1896. His father was Kolman Shokler (born in Russia, 1864; died in Cincinnati, 1934), and his mother was Ida Berg Shokler (born in Russian Poland, 1865; died in Cincinnati, 1944). Shokler had seven brothers and sisters, most of whom worked in the family business at one time or another. They were Rose Shokler Fisher (1889–1964), Philip Shokler (1891–1964), Morris Shokler (1893–1972), Fannie S. Shokler Brauer (1901–1997), Jean Shokler (1903–1999), Molly Shokler Glicksberg (1907–1990), and Amelia Shokler Hertzman (1912–).

In 1931 Shokler married Dahris Butterworth Martin (1900–1980). They had no children. Using Dahris Martin or Dahris B. Martin as her professional name, she was the author of many children's books. The two met while she was living in Kairouan, Tunisia, researching a book. After his arrival there he discovered that she was the only other American in the city and thus probably the person best able to help him overcome the language and culture barriers that confronted him. They became friends and she did give him the help he needed. Their wedding took place in New York after they had returned from their travels. Early in their marriage they lived in a small rented apartment in Brooklyn. In 1946 they moved to South Londonderry, Vermont, and lived there for the rest of their lives. Shokler died of complications following an automobile accident on September 11, 1978.
