= Aw Come Aw Wry =

Studio album by Phosphorescent
- Released: June 7, 2005
- Recorded: January–February 2005
- Genre: Indie folk Alt country
- Label: Misra Records

Phosphorescent chronology
The Weight of Flight (2004)	Aw Come Aw Wry (2005)	Pride (2007)

Professional ratings
Review scores
Source	Rating
Allmusic	4/5 stars
Pitchfork Media	(7.6/10)

Aw Come Aw Wry is the second full-length album by Phosphorescent and his first and only on the Misra Records label. It was released on June 7, 2005. The album art is a detail of the early Italian Renaissance fresco Effects of Good Government on the City Life, part of the series The Allegory of Good and Bad Government (1338–40) by Ambrogio Lorenzetti in the Palazzo Pubblico, Siena.

== Track listing ==
1. "Not a Heel" - 3:50
2. "Aw Come Aw Wry #5" - 0:45
3. "Joe Tex, These Taming Blues" - 5:30
4. "Aw Come Aw Wry #6" - 1:12
5. "I Am a Full Grown Man (I Will Lay in the Grass All Day)" - 5:31
6. "Dead Heart" - 5:49
7. "Aw Come Aw Wry #3" - 0:49
8. "South (Of America)" - 4:50
9. "Lost Name" - 5:02
10. "Endless, Pt. 1" - 3:36
11. "Endless, Pt. 2" - 6:55
12. "Nowhere Road, Georgia, February 21, 2005" - 18:57
