= Ben-Tuvia's goby =

Conservation status
- Data Deficient (IUCN 3.1)

Scientific classification
- Kingdom: Animalia
- Phylum: Chordata
- Class: Actinopterygii
- Order: Gobiiformes
- Family: Gobiidae
- Genus: Didogobius
- Species: D. bentuvii

Binomial name
- Didogobius bentuvii P. J. Miller, 1966

Species of fish

Ben-Tuvia's goby (Didogobius bentuvii) is a species of goby native to the Mediterranean Sea along the coast of Israel where it can be found on muddy sand bottoms at around a depth of 37 metres (121 ft). Both the specific name and the common name honour the Israeli ichthyologist Adam Ben-Tuvia (1919-1999) of the Hebrew University of Jerusalem, who collected type and who has made a significant contribution to the knowledge of the Mediterranean fish fauna.
