= Such Is Life =

Such Is Life may refer to:

== Film ==
- Such Is Life (1915 film), an American silent film starring Lon Chaney, Sr.
- Such Is Life (1924 film), an American silent short film starring Baby Peggy
- Such Is Life (1929 film) (Takový je život), a Czech film by Carl Junghans
- Such Is Life (1936 film), a British film starring Gene Gerrard
- Such Is Life (1939 film), an Argentine romantic drama
- Such Is Life (1996 film) (Sånt är livet), a film by Colin Nutley
- Such Is Life (2000 film), a Mexican drama
- Such Is Life: The Troubled Times of Ben Cousins, a 2010 Australian documentary film about Australian rules footballer Ben Cousins

== Other uses ==
- Such Is Life (novel), an 1897 novel by Joseph Furphy
- "Such Is Life", a 2001 song by Rank 1

== See also ==
- Así es la vida (disambiguation)
- C'est la vie (disambiguation)
