= Pride (Phosphorescent album) =

Studio album by Phosphorescent
- Released: October 23, 2007
- Genre: Indie folk
- Length: 40:39
- Label: Dead Oceans

Phosphorescent chronology
Aw Come Aw Wry (2005)	Pride (2007)	To Willie (2009)

Professional ratings
Review scores
Source	Rating
AllMusic	3.5/5 stars
Dusted Magazine	(favorable)
Stylus Magazine	(A−)
Pitchfork Media	(8.0/10)
PopMatters	(7/10)
Tiny Mix Tapes	4/5 marks

Pride is the third album by Phosphorescent and his first on the Dead Oceans label. It was released on October 23, 2007.

The song "Wolves" was used in the 2011 film Margin Call.

== Track listing ==
1. "A Picture of Our Torn Up Praise" - 3:17
2. "Be Dark Night" - 4:00
3. "Wolves" - 6:15
4. "At Death, A Proclamation" - 1:53
5. "The Waves at Night" - 4:18
6. "My Dove, My Lamb" - 9:26
7. "Cocaine Lights" - 6:02
8. "Pride " - 6:10
