= Rose-colored glasses =

Rose-colored glasses or rose-tinted glasses may refer to:

- Optimism, the tendency to see things in a positive light
- Rosy retrospection, the tendency to view past events in a positive (often unrealistic) light
- Chicken eyeglasses, one variety of which used rose-colored lenses

== Music ==
- "(Looking At The World Thru) Rose Colored Glasses", a song by Tommie Malie and Jimmy Steiger, recorded by Nick Lucas (1926)
- "Rose Coloured Glasses", a song by Hans Poulsen, recorded by John Farnham (1968)
- Rose Colored Glasses (album), by John Conlee (1978)
  - "Rose Colored Glasses" (John Conlee song), its title track
- "Rose-Coloured Glasses", a song on the album Outskirts by Blue Rodeo (1987)
- "Rose Colored Glasses" (Kelly Rowland song) (2010)
- "Rose Colored Glasses", a song on School of Fish's 1991 self-titled debut album
- "Rose Colored Glasses", a section of the song "The Whirlwind" on Transatlantic's 2009 The Whirlwind (album)
- "Rose Colored Lenses", a song on the album Endless Summer Vacation by Miley Cyrus (2023)

== See also ==
- Claude glass
- Cynicism (contemporary)
- Pessimism
- The Rose Tint, 2001 album by David Dallas
- Rose Tinted Enterprises, an Australian production company
- Skepticism
- La Vie en rose (disambiguation)
