= Henri Dikongué =

- Born: 6 December 1967 (age 58); Douala, Cameroon
- Occupations: Singer, guitarist
- Instruments: Vocals, guitar
- Label: Tinder Records
- Website: henridikongue.com

Henri Dikongué (born 6 December 1967) is a Cameroonian singer and guitarist.

== Life and career ==
Henri Dikongué was born on December 6, 1967, in Douala, Cameroon, raised into a family of musicians. He moved to France at the age of 23 to study law at the University of Besançon but later enrolled at the École Normale de Musique in Paris. While studying music in Paris, Dikongué tried unsuccessfully to secure a release for his first record. He later formed Masques et Tam-Tam, a theatre troupe which combined music and theatre. He worked with actor Martin Yog and musicians Alfred M'Bongo and Manuel Wandji. He also worked with the South African choir Banthu Maranatha.

After finally choosing to settle in Paris in 1989, he perfected his skills with classical guitar and collaborated with African musicians such as Manu Dibango and Papa Wemba. In 1995 he released his first album, Wa. His music mixes elements from makossa, bikutsi, reggae and rumba. He sings in his native tongue, Duala.

His second album, C'est la Vie, was released in 1997 and sold about 10,000 copies. Between 1997 and 1998, he toured Germany and the United States.

His third album, N'oublie jamais, was released in 2000. This album incorporated more musical styles such as reggae and flamenco, but the album wasn't as successful as his previous works.

== Discography ==
- Wa (1995)
- C'est la Vie (1997)
- N'oublie jamais (Never forget) (2000)
- Biso Nawa (2005)
- Diaspora (2016)
- Derrière ton masque (2023)
