= A Hundred Times or More =

Studio album by Phosphorescent
- Released: August 19, 2003
- Recorded: Radium Recording and The Makeshift Longhouse
- Genre: Indie folk Alt country
- Length: 58:24
- Label: Warm Records

Phosphorescent chronology
A Hundred Times or More (2003)	The Weight of Flight (2004)

Professional ratings
Review scores
Source	Rating
Allmusic	link

A Hundred Times or More is Phosphorescent's debut album. The LP was released via Athens, Georgia-based label Warm Records. It was released on August 19, 2003.

== Track listing ==
1. "Salt & Blues"
2. "Where to Strip"
3. "Bullet"
4. "Little, Pt. 1"
5. "Little, Pt. 2"
6. "How Far We All Come Away"
7. "Remain"
8. "Last of the Hand-Me-Downs"
9. "Pretty, Pt. 1"
10. "Pretty, Pt. 2"
