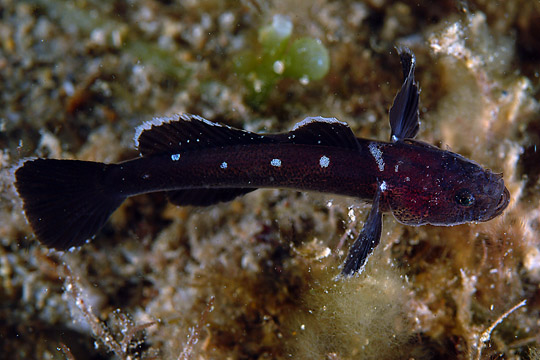
- Didogobius schlieweni

Scientific classification
- Kingdom: Animalia
- Phylum: Chordata
- Class: Actinopterygii
- Order: Gobiiformes
- Family: Gobiidae
- Subfamily: Gobiinae
- Genus: Didogobius; P. J. Miller, 1966

Type species
- Didogobius bentuvii P. J. Miller, 1966

= Didogobius =

Genus of fishes

Didogobius is a genus of small marine fish in the family Gobiidae, the true gobies. They are native to the eastern Atlantic Ocean and the Mediterranean Sea. The name of the genus is a compound noun made up of Dido, the mythical founder and first queen of Carthage, and the Latin gobius meaning "goby".

== Species ==
Seven recognized species are in this genus:

- Didogobius bentuvii Miller, 1966 (Ben-Tuvia's goby)
- Didogobius kochi Van Tassell, 1988
- Didogobius lanceolatus Schliewen, Knorrn & Böhmer, 2023
- Didogobius schlieweni Miller, 1993
