= Bon Courage =

- Presented by: Anouk Charlier
- Starring: Diane Stolojan (from episode 27 Diane Du Mont), Alain Leverrier, Henri Allan-Veillet, Gilles Marchais
- Country of origin: Germany
- Original languages: German, French
- No. of seasons: 3
- No. of episodes: 39

Original release
- Network: Bayerischer Rundfunk
- Release: 1991 – 1992

Bon Courage (English: Good luck) was a German educational television series produced by Bayerischer Rundfunk, teaching French as a foreign or second language to German viewers. Produced in 1991 and 1992, the series was divided into three parts of 13 episodes each, focusing on the essentials of the French language in daily life. It is presented by Anouk Charlier. The French actor Diane Stolojan (from Episode 27 Diane Du Mont), Alain Leverrier, Henri Allan Veillet and Gilles Marchais occur in scenes that reflect everyday situations in a humorous way. Anouk Charlier announces the exercises and comments on the films of the French culture and history in German. The title song is the Faust Waltz from the opera Faust by Charles Gounod.

The format of the episodes remains consistent throughout the series, with the opening and closing few minutes presenting a montage and explanation of various sites of cultural and historical importance in the respective cities. The dialogue between the characters is presented in full, followed by an explanation of new vocabulary and grammar rules, after which the dialogue repeats with on-screen text for certain key phrases that the viewer is expected to repeat. Before the closing montage, the viewer is instructed to recreate a similar dialogue based on visual aids provided.

The series is continued in the fourth trimester of the Telekollegs with the first season of C'est ça, la vie.

== Episodes ==
Episode	Season	Title	English translation	Place
1	1	Le comédien	The comedian	Strasbourg
Three friends agree to meet up in a café. The viewer is taught the words of certain drinks, such as coffee and beer, and how to order them. Greetings and farewell phrases, asking how somebody is doing, saying where one is from, posing questions, and asking for directions are demonstrated. Grammatical gender, articles, pertinent vocabulary, and the conjugation of être (to be) are also explained.
2	1	C'est complet	They're fully booked	Besançon
A family, two parents and three children, go to the local tourist information office for assistance with finding a hotel room. General touristic vocabulary is introduced, as well as the numbers 0-10 and how to ask how much an item costs. The present tense conjugation of être is presented, as well as plural formation, and the pronunciation of some letters.
3	1	La voisine	The neighbour	Dijon
A couple are moving in to a new apartment and have to deal with large amounts of moving boxes, as well as a nosy neighbour. Furniture, furnishings, and words related to the house are taught, as well as the French expression qu'est-ce que c'est? (what is it/this?). Possessive pronoun declination in the first and second person singular is shown, as well as the present tesen conjugation pattern of five more verbs. The effect of accent grave and accent agiu on pronunciation is also explained.
4	1	Les croissants	The croissants	Mâconnais
The dialogue is focused upon a person recently having retrained as a baker, and two of his regular customers. Emphasis is placed upon teaching the numbers 11–29, possessive pronoun declination in the third person singular, and the conjugation of avoir (to have). The fixed expression il y a (there is/are) and the rules of negation are also introduced.
5	1	Le spécialiste	The specialist	Grenoble
A recently unemployed psychologist visits a recruitment agency specialising in temporary work placements. Viewers are taught how to ask questions with est-ce que... ? (is it the case, that... ?) and via inversion. The first, second, and third person plural of possessive pronouns is taught, as well as the interrogatives qui (who) and où (where). The use of the circumflex and the pronunciation of other letters is also examined.
6	1	L'exposition Dala	The Dala Exhibit	Saint-Paul-de-Vence
The premiere of an art exhibition commences, in which the reveal of the artist's masterpiece takes place. Demonstrative pronouns for all genders and numbers are introduced, as well as the rules of adjective endings and the accompanying pronunciation differences. Imperative forms in the plural and formal singular are shown, as well as the present tense conjugation of faire (to do). Lastly, the numbers 30-69 are introduced.
7	1	En panne	Car troubles	Aix-en-Provence
A car breaks down beside a 'no stopping' road sign, leading to a dispute between a member of the policeforce and the driver. The interrogative quel (which) and its inflections are introduced, as well as the fundamentals of telling the time. In this episode the first two modal verbs — pouvoir (to be able) and vouloir (to want) — are shown in their present tense forms.
8	1	Studio à louer	Apartment for rent	Arles
A womanising sales agent attempts to persuade a client into purchasing an inadequate apartment. The interrogative pourquoi (why) and its connective parce que (because) are first introduced, followed by the irregular verb aller (to go), and then an explanation of the possessive in French. Finally, the usage of the French word for 'some' is clarified and the numbers 70-200 provided.
9	1	Au marché		Montpellier
10	1	Au restaurant		Collioure
11	1	Le brocanteur		Albi
12	1	A l'hôtel	At the hotel	Toulouse
A couple arrive at a hotel one day before their original reservation and encounter a number of inconveniences in the hotel. Emphasis is placed upon saying the date in French. Object pronouns are discussed in brief, and the conjugation of the directional verb venir (to come) is presented. Finally, the past participle of the auxiliaries avoir (to have) and être (to be) is shown.
13	1	A la montagne	In the mountains	Pau
A photographer tasked with taking pictures of a possible new location for a hotel is injured in the mountains. The differences between using avoir (to have) and être (to be) in the past perfect are explained, and the new verb voir (to see) is introduced. Personal pronouns in the objective case are explained, alongside a brief summary of word order with object pronouns. Finally, a recap of the pronunciation of all the aforementioned French place names takes place.
14	2	Le clown		Saint-Jean-Pied-de-Port
15	2	La journaliste		Biarritz
16	2	Le malade imaginaire		Dax
17	2	La vinothèque		Pauillac
18	2	Le célibataire		Bordeaux
19	2	Les élections		Périgueux
20	2	Les espions		Sarlat
21	2	Quelle surprise		Salers
22	2	En grève		Limoges
23	2	A la mairie		Saintes
24	2	Les huîtres		La Rochelle
25	2	Au tribunal		Poitiers
26	2	Un jeu		Bourges
27	3	Pour ma mère		Blois
28	3	L'Avare		Tours
29	3	Le costume		Nantes
30	3	Oscar et Julie		Rennes
31	3	Il faut tout changer		Perros-Guirec
32	3	L'inventeur		Bayeux
33	3	La vente aux enchères		Honfleur
34	3	Le traducteur		Rouen
35	3	Un rendez-vous		Amiens
36	3	Les enquêtes de Magret		Paris
37	3	La visite officielle		Seine
38	3	La lecture		Chartres
39	3	Merci!		Reims

== Literature ==
- Hannelore Gottschalk, Catherin Marsaud, Franz Baumer: Begleitbuch, Band 1, BRmedia, 2003, ISBN 3-8058-2418-1 (school book)
- Hannelore Gottschalk, Catherin Marsaud, Franz Baumer: Begleitbuch, Band 2, BRmedia, 2003, ISBN 3-8058-2506-4 (school book)
- Hannelore Gottschalk, Catherin Marsaud, Franz Baumer: Begleitbuch, Band 3, BRmedia, 2007, ISBN 978-3-940453-10-5 (school book)
- Hannelore Gottschalk, Catherin Marsaud, Franz Baumer: Arbeitsbuch, Band 1, BRmedia, 2001, ISBN 3-8058-2412-2 (exercise book)
- Hannelore Gottschalk, Catherin Marsaud, Franz Baumer: Arbeitsbuch, Band 2, BRmedia, 2003, ISBN 3-8058-2474-2 (exercise book)
- Hannelore Gottschalk, Catherin Marsaud, Franz Baumer: Arbeitsbuch, Band 3, BRmedia, 2003, ISBN 3-8058-2584-6 (exercise book)

== MCs ==
- Bon courage, Audiocassette zum Begleitbuch 1, ISBN 3-8058-2430-0
- Bon courage, Audiocassette zum Begleitbuch 2
- Bon courage, Audiocassette zum Begleitbuch 3, ISBN 3-8058-2585-4
- Bon courage, Audiocassette zum Arbeitsbuch 1,
- Bon courage, Audiocassette zum Arbeitsbuch 2, ISBN 3-8058-2476-9
- Bon courage, Audiocassette zum Arbeitsbuch 3, ISBN 3-8058-2586-2

== DVD ==
Bon Courage, 39 Folgen, BR Mitschnittservice

== See also ==
- C'est ça, la vie
- List of German television series
