= English compound =

Aspect of English grammar

A compound is a word composed of more than one free morpheme. The English language, like many others, uses compounds frequently. English compounds may be classified in several ways, such as the word classes or the semantic relationship of their components.

== History ==
English inherits the ability to form compounds from its parent the Proto-Indo-European language and expands on it. Close to two-thirds of the words in the Old English poem Beowulf are found to be compounds. Of all the types of word-formation in English, compounding is said to be the most productive.

== Compound nouns ==
Most English compound nouns are noun phrases (i.e. nominal phrases) that include a noun modified by adjectives or noun adjuncts. Due to the English tendency toward conversion, the two classes are not always easily distinguished. Most English compound nouns that consist of more than two words can be constructed recursively by combining two words at a time. Combining "science" and "fiction", and then combining the resulting compound with "writer", for example, can construct the compound "science fiction writer" or "science-fiction writer". Some compounds, such as salt and pepper or mother-of-pearl, cannot be constructed in this way, however.

=== Orthography: open, hyphenated, or solid (closed up) ===
English uses many open compound nouns, a large subclass of which, by convention in accepted English orthography, are not closed up (not solidified) and are sometimes optionally hyphenated in attributive position (that is, when functioning as a noun adjunct). Examples are high school, kidney disease, and file format. Although some other languages would close up these nouns' components (for example, German usually does so), English has a tendency whereby it closes up only certain ones, usually only ones in which the head noun is monosyllabic (and even within that category, only sometimes, and in a way that is not fully standardized). For example, data set and dataset, or file name and filename, are accepted alternative forms, but file format, data format, and data analysis, which have multisyllabic heads (format and analysis), can only be spelled as open in accepted English orthography. This pattern holds for countless nouns with few exceptions. For the class with monosyllabic heads, there is a tendency that "compounds tend to solidify as they age," which is how a term such as data set becomes dataset, pin-up becomes pinup, coal mine becomes coalmine, bottle cap becomes bottlecap, and so on. Such alternative forms usually continue to coexist in accepted use; style guides often convene on preferred dictionaries as a way of achieving consistency, by declaring that the headword form there will be the default styling for each such term.

=== Types of compound nouns ===
==== Native English compound ====
Since English is a mostly analytic language, unlike most other Germanic languages, it creates compounds by concatenating words without case markers.

Examples by word class
Modifier	Head	Compound
noun	noun	football
adjective	noun	blackboard
verb	noun	breakwater
preposition	noun	underworld
noun	adjective	waterproof
adjective	adjective	bittersweet
verb	adverb	drive-through
preposition	adjective	over-ripe
noun	verb	nosebleed
adjective	verb	shortcoming
verb	verb	buy-bust
preposition	verb	undercut
noun	preposition	love-in
adverb	preposition	once-over
verb	adverb	takeout
preposition	adverb	forever

Most noun-verb compounds denoting people are of the form noun + verb + -er, where the noun is the object of the verb, for example fire-fighter. However, there are a few dozen common verb-object compounds – mostly dating from the 16th century and mostly with negative connotations – which have the opposite French order and which do not have a suffix -er. These have been labeled cutthroat compounds because 'cutthroat' is a typical example.

As in other Germanic languages, the compounds may be arbitrarily long. (Note: "There is no structural limitation on the recursivity of compounding, but the longer a compound becomes the more difficult it is for the speakers/listeners to process, i.e. produce and understand correctly. Extremely long compounds are therefore disfavored not for structural but for processing reasons." - Plag) However, this is obscured by the fact that the written representation of long compounds always contains spaces. Short compounds may be written in three different forms, which do not correspond to different pronunciations, though:

- The spaced or open form usually consisting of newer combinations or longer words, such as "distance learning", "player piano", "ice cream".
- The hyphenated form in which two or more words are connected by a hyphen. The following types of compounds are often hyphenated:
  - Compounds that contain affixes: "house-build(er)" and "single-mind(ed)(ness)",
  - Adjective–adjective compounds: "blue-green",
  - Verb–verb compounds: "lend-lease",
  - Compounds that contain articles, prepositions or conjunctions: "rent-a-cop", "mother-of-pearl" and "hide-and-seek".
- The solid or closed form in which two usually moderately short words appear together as one. Solid compounds most likely consist of short (monosyllabic) units that often have been established in the language for a long time. Examples are "housewife", "lawsuit", "wallpaper", "basketball".

Usage in the US and in the UK differs and often depends on the individual choice of the writer rather than on a hard-and-fast rule; therefore, spaced, hyphenated, and solid forms may be encountered for the same compound noun, such as the triplets place name/place-name/placename and particle board/particle-board/particleboard.

==== Neo-classical compound ====
In addition to this native English compounding, there is the neo-classical type, which consists of words derived from Classical Latin, as horticulture, and those of Ancient Greek origin, such as photography, the components of which are in bound form (connected by connecting vowels, which are most often -i- and -o- in Classical Latin and Ancient Greek respectively) and cannot stand alone.

=== Analyzability (transparency) ===
In general, the meaning of a compound noun is a specialization of the meaning of its head. The modifier limits the meaning of the head. This is most obvious in descriptive compounds (known as karmadharaya compounds in the Sanskrit tradition), in which the modifier is used in an attributive or appositional manner. A blackboard is a particular kind of board, which is (generally) black, for instance.

In determinative compounds, however, the relationship is not attributive. For example, a footstool is not a particular type of stool that is like a foot. Rather, it is a stool for one's foot or feet. (It can be used for sitting on, but that is not its primary purpose.) In a similar manner, an office manager is the manager of an office, an armchair is a chair with arms, and a raincoat is a coat against the rain. These relationships, which are expressed by prepositions in English, would be expressed by grammatical case in other languages. (Compounds of this type are known as tatpurusha in the Sanskrit tradition.)

Both of the above types of compounds are called endocentric compounds because the semantic head is contained within the compound itself—a blackboard is a type of board, for example, and a footstool is a type of stool.

However, in another common type of compound, the exocentric (known as a bahuvrihi compound in the Sanskrit tradition), the semantic head is not explicitly expressed. A redhead, for example, is not a kind of head, but is a person with red hair. Similarly, a blockhead is also not a head, but a person with a head that is as hard and unreceptive as a block (i.e. stupid). And a lionheart is not a type of heart, but a person with a heart like a lion (in its bravery, courage, fearlessness, etc.).

There is a general way to tell the two apart. In a compound "[X . Y]":

- Can one substitute Y with a noun that is a Y, or a verb that does Y? This is an endocentric compound.
- Can one substitute Y with a noun that is with Y? This is an exocentric compound.

Exocentric compounds occur more often in adjectives than nouns. A V-8 car is a car with a V-8 engine rather than a car that is a V-8, and a twenty-five-dollar car is a car with a worth of $25, not a car that is $25. The compounds shown here are bare, but more commonly, a suffixal morpheme is added, such as -ed: a two-legged person is a person with two legs, and this is exocentric.

On the other hand, endocentric adjectives are also frequently formed, using the suffixal morphemes -ing or -er/or. A people-carrier is a clear endocentric determinative compound: it is a thing that is a carrier of people. The related adjective, car-carrying, is also endocentric: it refers to an object which is a carrying-thing (or equivalently, which does carry).

These types account for most compound nouns, but there are other, rarer types as well. Coordinative, copulative or dvandva compounds combine elements with a similar meaning, and the compound meaning may be a generalization instead of a specialization. Bosnia-Herzegovina, for example, is the combined area of Bosnia and Herzegovina, but a fighter-bomber is an aircraft that is both a fighter and a bomber. Iterative or amredita compounds repeat a single element, to express repetition or as an emphasis. Day by day and go-go are examples of this type of compound, which has more than one head.

Analyzability may be further limited by cranberry morphemes and semantic changes. For instance, the word butterfly, commonly thought to be a metathesis for flutter by, which the bugs do, is actually based on an old wives' tale that butterflies are small witches that steal butter from window sills. Cranberry is a part translation from Low German, which is why we cannot recognize the element cran (from the Low German kraan or kroon, "crane"). The ladybird or ladybug was named after the Christian expression "our Lady, the Virgin Mary".

In the case of verb+noun compounds, the noun may be either the subject or the object of the verb. In playboy, for example, the noun is the subject of the verb (the boy plays), whereas it is the object in callgirl (someone calls the girl).

=== Sound patterns ===
Stress patterns may distinguish a compound word from a noun phrase consisting of the same component words. For example, a black board, adjective plus noun, is any board that is black, and has equal stress on both elements. (Note: When said in isolation, additional prosodic stress falls on the second word, but this disappears in the appropriate context.) The compound blackboard, on the other hand, though it may have started out historically as black board, now is stressed on only the first element, black. (Note: Some dictionaries mark secondary stress on the second element,, board. However, this is a typographic convention due to the lack of sufficient symbols to distinguish full from reduced vowels in unstressed syllables. See secondary stress for more.) Thus a compound such as the White House normally has a falling intonation which a phrase such as a white house does not. (Note: A similar falling intonation occurs in phrases when these are emphatically contrasted, as in "Not the black house, the white house!")

== Compound modifiers ==
English compound modifiers are constructed in a very similar way to the compound noun. Blackboard Jungle, leftover ingredients, gunmetal sheen, and green monkey disease are only a few examples.

A compound modifier is a sequence of modifiers of a noun that function as a single unit. It consists of two or more words (adjectives, gerunds, or nouns) of which the left-hand component modifies the right-hand one, as in "the dark-green dress": dark modifies the green that modifies dress.

=== Solid compound modifiers ===
There are some well-established permanent compound modifiers that have become solid over a longer period, especially in American usage: earsplitting, eyecatching, and downtown.

However, in British usage, these, apart from downtown, are more likely written with a hyphen: ear-splitting, eye-catching.

Other solid compound modifiers are for example:

- Numbers that are spelled out and have the suffix -fold added: "fifteenfold", "sixfold".
- Points of the compass: northwest, northwestern, northwesterly, northwestwards. In British usage, the hyphenated and open versions are more common: north-western, north-westerly, north west, north-westwards.

=== Hyphenated compound modifiers ===
Major style guides advise consulting a dictionary to determine whether a compound modifier should be hyphenated; the dictionary's hyphenation should be followed even when the compound modifier follows a noun (that is, regardless of whether in attributive or predicative position), because they are permanent compounds (whereas the general rule with temporary compounds is that hyphens are omitted in the predicative position because they are used only when necessary to prevent misreading, which is usually only in the attributive position, and even there, only on a case-by-case basis).

Generally, a compound modifier is hyphenated if the hyphen helps the reader differentiate a compound modifier from two adjacent modifiers that modify the noun independently. Compare the following examples:

- "small appliance industry": a small industry producing appliances
- "small-appliance industry": an industry producing small appliances (Note: When a noun is used as a modifier, the singular form is generally used (even when more than one is meant). Thus, an industry that makes small appliances is a "small-appliance industry", an appliance to press trousers is a "trouser press" (and each pair of trousers may have four "trouser pockets"), a woman who is 28 years old is a 28-year-old woman, and a vehicle with four wheels may have four-wheel drive. There are occasional exceptions to this general rule: for instance, with fractions (a two-thirds majority) and with lexically distinct singular and plural senses ("glasses-case design" vs. "glass-case design", or "arms-race prediction" vs. "arm-race prediction").)

The hyphen is unneeded when capitalization or italicization makes grouping clear:

- "old English scholar": an old person who is English and a scholar, or an old scholar who studies English
- "Old English scholar": a scholar of Old English.
- "De facto proceedings" (not "de-facto")

If, however, there is no risk of ambiguities, it may be written without a hyphen: Sunday morning walk (a "walk on Sunday morning" is practically the same as a "morning walk on Sunday").

Hyphenated compound modifiers may have been formed originally by an adjective preceding a noun, when this phrase in turn precedes another noun:

- "Round table" → "round-table discussion"
- "Blue sky" → "blue-sky law"
- "Red light" → "red-light district"
- "Four wheels" → "four-wheel drive" (historically, the singular or root is used, not the plural)

Others may have originated with a verb preceding an adjective or adverb:

- "Feel good" → "feel-good factor"
- "Buy now, pay later" → "buy-now pay-later purchase"

Yet others are created with an original verb preceding a preposition.

- "Stick on" → "stick-on label"
- "Walk on" → "walk-on part"
- "Stand by" → "stand-by fare"
- "Roll on, roll off" → "roll-on roll-off ferry"

The following compound modifiers are always hyphenated when they are not written as one word:

- An adjective preceding a noun to which -d or -ed has been added as a past-participle construction, used before a noun:
  - "loud-mouthed hooligan"
  - "middle-aged lady"
  - "rose-tinted glasses"
- A noun, adjective, or adverb preceding a present participle:
  - "an awe-inspiring personality"
  - "a long-lasting affair"
  - "a far-reaching decision"
- Numbers, whether or not spelled out, that precede a noun:
  - "seven-year itch"
  - "five-sided polygon"
  - "20th-century poem"
  - "30-piece band"
  - "tenth-storey window"
  - "a 20-year-old man" (as a compound modifier) and "the 20-year-old" (as a compound noun)—but "a man, who is 20 years old"
- A numeral with the affix -fold has a hyphen (15-fold), but when spelled out takes a solid construction (fifteenfold).
- Numbers, spelled out or not, with added -odd: sixteen-odd, 70-odd.
- Compound modifiers with high- or low-: "high-level discussion", "low-price markup".
- Colours in compounds:
  - "a dark-blue sweater"
  - "a reddish-orange dress".
- Fractions as modifiers are hyphenated: "two-thirds majority", but if numerator or denominator are already hyphenated, the fraction itself does not take a hyphen: "a thirty-three thousandth part". (Fractions used as nouns have no hyphens: "I ate two thirds of the pie.")
- Comparatives and superlatives in compound adjectives also take hyphens:
  - "the highest-placed competitor"
  - "a shorter-term loan"
- However, a construction with most is not hyphenated:
  - "the most respected member".
- Compounds including two geographical modifiers:

- "Anglo-Indian"
But not
- "Central American", which refers to people from a specific geographical region
- "African American", as a hyphen is seen to disparage minority populations as a hyphenated ethnicity

The following compound modifiers are not normally hyphenated:

- Compound modifiers that are not hyphenated in the relevant dictionary or that are unambiguous without a hyphen.
- Where there is no risk of ambiguity:
  - "a Sunday morning walk"
- Left-hand components of a compound modifier that end in -ly and that modify right-hand components that are past participles (ending in -ed):
  - "a hotly disputed subject"
  - "a greatly improved scheme"
  - "a distantly related celebrity"
- Compound modifiers that include comparatives and superlatives with more, most, less or least:
  - "a more recent development"
  - "the most respected member"
  - "a less opportune moment"
  - "the least expected event"
- Ordinarily hyphenated compounds with intensive adverbs in front of adjectives:
  - "very much admired classicist"
  - "really well accepted proposal"

== Using a group of compound nouns containing the same "head" ==
Special rules apply when multiple compound nouns with the same "head" are used together, often with a conjunction (and with hyphens and commas if they are needed).

- The third- and fourth-grade teachers met with the parents.
- Both full- and part-time employees will get raises this year.
- We don't see many 3-, 4-, and 5-year-old children around here.

== Compound verbs ==
modifier	head	examples
adverb	verb	overrate, underline, outrun
adverb	verb	downsize, upgrade
adjective	verb	whitewash, blacklist
adjective	noun	badmouth
noun	verb	browbeat, sidestep, manhandle
preposition	noun	out-Herod, outfox

A compound verb is usually composed of an adverb and a verb, although other combinations also exist. The term compound verb was first used in publication in Grattan and Gurrey's Our Living Language (1925).

Some compound verbs are difficult to analyze morphologically because several derivations are plausible. Blacklist, for instance, might be analyzed as an adjective+verb compound, or as an adjective+noun compound that becomes a verb through zero derivation. Most compound verbs originally have the collective meaning of both components, but some of them later gain additional meanings that may supersede the original, emergent sense. Therefore, sometimes the resultant meanings are seemingly barely related to the original contributors.

Compound verbs composed of a noun and verb are comparatively rare, and the noun is generally not the direct object of the verb.

Examples of compound verbs following the pattern of indirect-object+verb include "hand wash" (e.g. "you wash it by hand" ~> "you handwash it"), and "breastfeed" (e.g. "she feeds the baby with/by/from her breast" ~> "she breastfeeds the baby").

Examples of non-existent direct-object+verb compound verbs would be *"bread-bake" (Note: This article uses asterisks to indicate ungrammatical examples.) (e.g. "they bake bread" ~> *"they bread-bake") and *"car-drive" (e.g. "they drive a car" ~> *"they car-drive").

Note the example of a compound like "foxhunt": although this matches the direct-object+verb pattern, it is not grammatically used in a sentence as a verb, but rather as a noun (e.g. "they're hunting foxes tomorrow" ~> "they're going on a foxhunt tomorrow", but "not" *"they're foxhunting tomorrow").

=== Hyphenation ===
Compound verbs with single-syllable modifiers are often solid, or unhyphenated. Those with longer modifiers may originally be hyphenated, but as they became established, they became solid, e.g.

- overhang (English origin)
- counterattack (Latin origin)

There was a tendency in the 18th century to use hyphens excessively, that is, to hyphenate all previously established solid compound verbs. American English, however, has diminished the use of hyphens, while British English is more conservative.

=== Phrasal verbs ===
English syntax distinguishes between phrasal verbs and adverbial adjuncts. Consider the following sentences:

I held up my hand implies that I raised my hand.
I held up the negotiations implies that I delayed the negotiations.
I held up the bank to the highest standard implies that I demanded model behavior regarding the bank.
I held up the bank implies either (a) that I robbed the bank or (b) that I lifted upward a bank [either literally, as for a toy bank, or figuratively, as in putting a bank forward as an example of something (although usually then the sentence would end with ... as an exemplar. or similar)].

Each of the foregoing sentences implies a contextually distinguishable meaning of the word, "up," but the fourth sentence may differ syntactically, depending on whether it intends meaning (a) or (b). Specifically, the first three sentences render held up as a phrasal verb that expresses an idiomatic, figurative, or metaphorical sense that depends on the contextual meaning of the particle, "up." The fourth sentence, however, ambiguously renders up either as (a) a particle that complements "held," or as (b) an adverb that modifies "held." The ambiguity is minimized by rewording and providing more context to the sentences under discussion:

I held my hand up implies that I raised my hand.
I held the negotiations up implies that I delayed the negotiations.
I held the bank up to the highest standard implies that I expect model behavior regarding the bank.
I held the bank up upstairs implies that I robbed the upstairs bank.
I held the bank up the stairs implies that I lifted a (toy) bank along an upstairs route.

Thus, the fifth sentence renders "up" as the head word of an adverbial prepositional phrase that modifies, the verb, held. The first four sentences remain phrasal verbs.

The Oxford English Grammar (ISBN 0-19-861250-8) distinguishes seven types of phrasal verbs in English:

- intransitive phrasal verbs (e.g. give in)
- transitive phrasal verbs (e.g. find out [discover])
- monotransitive prepositional verbs (e.g. look after [care for])
- doubly transitive prepositional verbs (e.g. blame [something] on [someone])
- copular prepositional verbs. (e.g. serve as)
- monotransitive phrasal-prepositional verbs (e.g. look up to [respect])
- doubly transitive phrasal-prepositional verbs (e.g. put [something] down to [someone] [attribute to])

English has a number of other kinds of compound verb idioms. There are compound verbs with two verbs (e.g. make do). These too can take idiomatic prepositions (e.g. get rid of). There are also idiomatic combinations of verb and adjective (e.g. come true, run amok) and verb and adverb (make sure), verb and fixed noun (e.g. go ape); and these, too, may have fixed idiomatic prepositions (e.g. take place on).

=== Misuses of the term ===
"Compound verb" is often confused with:

1. "verb phrase"/"verbal phrase"—Headed by a verb, many verbal phrases are multi-word but some are one-word: a verb (which could be a compound verb).
2. "phrasal verb"—A sub-type of verb phrase, which has a Grammatical particle before or after the verb, often having a more or less idiomatic meaning.
3. "complex verb"—A type of complex phrase: In linguistics, while both "compound" and "complex" contrast with "simple", they are not synonymous (simple involves a single element, compound involves multiple similar elements, complex involves multiple dissimilar elements).

== See also ==
- Metaphor
- Phrasal verb
- Portmanteau
- Syllabic abbreviations
- Morphology

== Bibliography ==
- Fortson, Benjamin W (2010). Indo-European Language and Culture (2010 ed.). Wiley-Blackwell. ISBN 978-1-4051-8895-1.
- Adams, Valerie (1987). An Introduction to Modern English Word-Formation. Longman Group. ISBN 0-582-55042-4.
- Plag, Ingo (2003). Word-Formation in English. Cambridge University Press. ISBN 978-0-521-52563-3.
- Meyer, Charles (2009). Introducing English Linguistics (1st ed.). Cambridge University Press. ISBN 978-0-521-83350-9.
- Carstairs-McCarthy, Andrew (2002). An Introduction to English Morphology. Edinburgh University Press. ISBN 0-7486-1326-9.
- Pinker, Steven (1994). The Language Instinct (1st ed.). Great Britain: Penguin Books. ISBN 978-0-14-017529-5.
