= To Willie =

Studio album by Phosphorescent
- Released: 2009
- Genre: indie
- Label: Dead Oceans

Phosphorescent chronology
| Pride (2007) | To Willie (2009) | Here's to Taking It Easy (2010) |

Professional ratings
Review scores
| Source | Rating |
|---|---|
| Allmusic | 3.5/5 stars |

To Willie is the fourth full-length album by Phosphorescent, and his second on the Dead Oceans label. The album is a tribute to Willie Nelson, with cover artwork in the style of Nelson's To Lefty From Willie, itself a cover album.

Rhapsody praised the album, calling it one of their favorite cover albums.

== Track listing ==
1. "Reasons to Quit" - 3:13
2. "Too Sick to Pray" - 2:37
3. "Walkin'" - 3:44
4. "It's Not Supposed to Be That Way" - 3:35
5. "Pick Up the Tempo" - 3:17
6. "I Gotta Get Drunk" - 3:38
7. "Can I Sleep in Your Arms" - 3:44
8. "Heartaches of a Fool" - 3:26
9. "Permanently Lonely" - 3:03
10. "Last Thing I Needed First Thing This Morning" - 4:26
11. "The Party's Over" - 3:53
