= The Weight of Flight =

EP by Phosphorescent
- Released: June 8, 2004
- Recorded: December 2003 – January 2004
- Genres: Indie folk Alt country
- Label: Warm Records

Phosphorescent chronology
A Hundred Times or More (2003)	The Weight of Flight (2004)	Aw Come Aw Wry (2005)

The Weight of Flight is the second official release from Phosphorescent. The EP was released via Athens-based label Warm Records, on June 8, 2004.

== Track listing ==
1. "Toes Out to Sea"
2. "All of It, All"
3. "When We Fall"
4. "My Heroes Have Always Been Cowboys"
5. "Not Right, You Know"
6. "Mrs. Juliette Low"
