= Lavena =

Lavena may refer to:

- Lavena Back, a character on Love Island
- Lavena Cavuru (born 1994), Fijian rugby sevens player
- LaVena Johnson (1985–2005), United States army soldier
- Lavena Saltonstall (1881–1957), English suffragette and writer

== See also ==
- Lavina (disambiguation)
- Lavenia (disambiguation)
