= That's Life =

That's Life may refer to:

== Film and television ==
- That's Life! (film), a 1986 comedy-drama directed by Blake Edwards
- That's Life (1980 film), a French film directed by Paul Vecchiali
- That's Life (1998 film) (Così è la vita), an Italian film by Aldo, Giovanni & Giacomo
- That's Life!, a 1970s–1990s UK magazine-style TV series
- That's Life (1968 TV series), an American television musical comedy series
- That's Life (1998 TV series), an American sitcom
- That's Life (2000 TV series), an American drama
- "That's Life", an episode of The Fairly OddParents

== Music ==
=== Albums ===
- That's Life (Frank Sinatra album), 1966
- That's Life (Julia Fordham album), 2004
- That's Life (Neal McCoy album), 2005
- That's Life (Russell Watson album), 2007
- That's Life (Sham 69 album), 1978
- That's Life, a 1996 album by Gangway
- That's Life – Can't Get Enough, an album by Mick Ralphs

=== Songs ===
- "That's Life" (song), by Dean Kay and Kelly Gordon, 1963
- "That's Life" (88-Keys song), 2019
- "That's Life", a song by Lime Cordiale from the 2020 album 14 Steps to a Better You
- "That's Life", a 2021 song by Still Woozy

== Publications ==
- That's Life (magazine), a UK true-story magazine for young women
- That's Life! (Australian magazine), a reality-based magazine

== See also ==
- That's Live, an album by Victory
- "That Life", a 2021 song by Unknown Mortal Orchestra from the album V
- C'est la vie (disambiguation)
