= Beatrice Cuming =

American artist

- Born: 1903; Brooklyn, New York
- Died: 1974 (aged 70–71); Uncasville, Connecticut
- Known for: Painting, Printmaking, Educator

Beatrice Laving Cuming (1903–1974) was an American illustrator known for her work with the Works Progress Administration (WPA).

== Biography ==
Cuming was born in 1903 in Brooklyn, New York. She studied at the Pratt Institute and spent several summers in Boothbay Harbor, Maine studying with Henry B. Snell. Cuming spent the years 1924 through 1926 in Europe and Africa. In Paris she studied at the Académie Colarossi, the Académie de la Grande Chaumière as well as with André Lhote and at the Académie Moderne. She returned to the United states for a few years, studying at the Art Students League of New York. In the 1930s Cuming traveled to Tunisia with Dahris Butterworth Martin.

In 1934 Cuming moved to New London, Connecticut. She worked for two Works Progress Administration programs, the Public Works of Art Project and the Federal Art Project. Cuming went on to teach art in the New London public schools, the Lyman Allyn Museum, and her own studio in New London. She died in 1974 in Uncasville, Connecticut.

Cuming was the recipient of six MacDowell fellowships (1934, 1938, 1943, 1944, 1946, 1952). Her work was included in the 1942 exhibition Art in War at the Museum of Modern Art. In 1990 the Lyman Allyn Art Museum held a retrospective of her work. Her work is in the collection of the Lyman Allyn Art Museum, the Metropolitan Museum of Art, and the National Gallery of Art.
