= Lavina (given name) =

Popular name for women among Amish Christian

Lavina is a feminine given name. It is a variant of the name Lavinia, a name of Etruscan origin and a figure from Roman mythology. Lavina is a popular name for women and girls among the Amish.

It may refer to:

- Lavina Fielding Anderson (1944–2023), American historian
- Lavina Keough (1927–2001), American baseball player
- Lavina Martins (born 1993), Kenyan badminton player
- Lavina Tandon, Indian actress
- Lavina Williams (born 1979), New Zealand musical artist and musical theatre performer
