= 2019–20 Coppa Italia Dilettanti =

Tournament details
- Country: Italy
- Teams: 19

The 2019–20 Coppa Italia Dilettanti was the 55th edition of Coppa Italia Dilettanti. Participants in the competition include all teams of 2019–20 Eccellenza and some teams of 2019–20 Promozione, the fifth and sixth tier of the Italian football pyramid, respectively. The winner of the competition were promoted to 2020–21 Serie D. (Note: The team is promoted to Serie D only if it competes in Eccellenza and if it does not relegate to Promozione.)

Due to the COVID-19 pandemic in Italy, on 20 May 2020, Lega Nazionale Dilettanti decided not to complete the competition.

== Format ==
All the teams of 2019–20 Eccellenza participate in the competition together with some 2019–20 Promozione teams who are invited to participate.

The winners of Regional Cups qualify for the main competition.

The national stage consists of 8 groups. Three groups consist of 3 teams, the remaining five consist of 2 teams.

The teams participating in the national phase are included in the groups following this scheme.

Group A: Liguria, Lombardy, Piedmont/Vallé d'Aoste

Group B: Friuli-Venezia Giulia, Trentino, Trentino-Alto Adige/Südtirol, Veneto

Group C: Emilia-Romagna, Tuscany

Group D: Marche, Umbria

Group E: Lazio, Sardinia

Group F: Abruzzo, Molise

Group G: Basilicata, Campania, Apulia

Group H: Calabria, Sicily

The matches, in the three-team groups, are one-legged. Matches in two-team groups are two-legged. The winners of the eight groups go through to the quarter-finals. The quarter-finals and semi-finals are two-legged, while the final is one-legged.

All teams must field at least one player born after 1 January 2000 and one after 1 January 2001.

== Teams ==
=== Winners of regional cups ===
- Abruzzo: Torrese
- Apulia: Corato
- Basilicata: Vultur
- Calabria: San Luca
- Campania: Acragolese
- Emilia-Romagna: Virtus Castelfranco
- Friuli-Venezia Giulia: Manzanese
- Lazio: Real Monterotondo Scalo
- Liguria: Sestri Levante
- Lombardy: Casatese
- Marche: Forsempronese
- Molise: Tre Pini Matese
- Piedmont/Aosta Valley: Chisola
- Sardinia: Carbonia
- Sicily: Giarre
- Tuscany: San Marco Avenza
- Trentino-South Tyrol: Trento
- Umbria: Tiferno Lecchi
- Veneto: Sandonà 1922

== Group stage ==
=== Group A ===
4 March 2020	Chisola (5)	0–3	Sestri Levante (5)	Vinovo, Turin
14:30 CET			Bergamino 18'; Panepinto 42'; Parodi 45'	Stadium: Stadio Dino Marola

8 April 2020	Casatese (5)	Not played	Chisola (5)	Casatenovo
15:00 CEST				Stadium: Stadio comunale

Sestri Levante (5)	Not played	Casatese (5)	Sestri Levante
			Stadium: Stadio Giuseppe Sivori

=== Group B ===
4 March 2020	Sandonà 1922 (5)	1–2	Manzanese (5)	San Donà di Piave
14:30 CET	Intacasciato 28'		Duca 16'; Corvaglia 76'	Stadium: Stadio Verino Zanutto

8 April 2020	Trento (5)	Not played	Sandonà 1922 (5)	Trento
14:30 CEST				Stadium: Stadio Bramasco

Manzanese (5)	Not played	Trento (5)	Manzano
			Stadium: Stadio Giuseppe Morini

=== Group C ===
26 February 2020	San Marco Avenza (5)	2–1	Virtus Castelfranco (5)	Carrara
15:30 CET	Da Pozzo 47'; Tescione 90+2'		Assouan 33'	Stadium: Stadio Paolo Seste

4 March 2020	Virtus Castelfranco (5)	0–0 (1–2 agg.)	San Marco Avenza (5)	Castelfranco Emilia
15:00 CEST				Stadium: Stadio Fausto Ferrarini

=== Group D ===
26 February 2020	Tiferno Lerchi (5)	0–2	Forsempronese (5)	Città di Castello
18:30 CET			Conti 18'; Pagliari 67'	Stadium: Stadio Corrado Bernicchi

8 April 2020	Forsempronese (5)	Not played	Tiferno Lerchi (5)	Fossombrone
				Stadium: Stadio Marcello Bonci

=== Group E ===
26 February 2020	Real Monterotondo Scalo (5)	3–1	Carbonia (5)	Monterotondo
14:30 CET	Lupi 14', 56'; Lalli 26' (pen.)		Meloni 10'	Stadium: Stadio Ottavio Pierangeli

4 March 2020	Carbonia (5)	1–0 (2–3 agg.)	Real Monterotondo Scalo (5)	Carbonia
14:30 CET	Kassama 58'			Stadium: Stadio Carlo Zoboli

=== Group F ===
26 February 2020	Torrese (5)	2–0	Tre Pini Matese (5)	Castellalto
14:30 CET	Di Federico 37'; Di Francesco 90+5'			Stadium: Stadio comunale

4 March 2020	Tre Pini Matese (5)	1–2 (1–4 agg.)	Torrese (5)	Piedimonte Matese
14:30 CET	Langellotti 84' (pen.)		Mosca 76'; Criscolo 90+1'	Stadium: Stadio Pasqualino Ferrante

=== Group G ===
26 February 2020	Afragolese (5)	2–0	Vultur (5)	Cardito
14:30 CET	Fava 83', 90'			Stadium: Stadio Vittorio Papa

4 March 2020	Vultur (5)	1–3	Corato (5)	Rionero in Vulture
14:30 CET	Vicedomini 58' (o.g.)		Petitti 59'; Leonetti 73'; Agodirin 82'	Stadium: Stadio Pasquale Corona

8 April 2020	Corato (5)	Not played	Afragolese (5)	Ruvo di Puglia
				Stadium: Stadio Fausto Coppi

=== Group H ===
26 February 2020	San Luca (5)	1–0	Giarre (5)	San Luca
14:30 CET	Pelle 58'			Stadium: Stadio Corrado Alvaro

4 March 2020	Giarre (5)	2–1 (2–2 (a) agg.)	San Luca (5)	Giarre
14:30 CET	Cocimano 20'; Maimone 51'		Catania 63'	Stadium: Stadio Regionale

== Knock-out stage ==
=== Quarter-finals ===
==== First leg ====
v

San Marco Avenza (5)	Not played

Real Monterotondo Scalo (5)	Not played	Torrese (5)

Not played	San Luca (5)

==== Second leg ====
v

Not played	San Marco Avenza (5)

Torrese (5)	Not played	Real Monterotondo Scalo (5)

San Luca (5)	Not played
