= Lavinia (given name) =

Lavinia is a feminine given name which may refer to:

- Lavinia Blackwall, member of the Scottish folk rock group Trembling Bells (formed 2008)
- Lavinia Burnett (1785–1845), first woman to be executed in the state of Arkansas
- Lavinia Byrne (born 1948), Roman Catholic former nun
- Lavinia Crosse (1821–1890), English founder of the Anglican religious order Community of All Hallows
- Lavinia Fenton (1708–1760), English actress
- Lavinia Fisher (1793–1820), first female serial killer in the United States of America
- Lavinia Fitzalan-Howard, Duchess of Norfolk (1916–1995), British peeress
- Lavinia Fontana (1552–1614), Italian painter
- Lavinia S. Goodwin (1833–1911), American author, educator
- Lavinia Greenlaw (born 1962), English poet and novelist
- Lavinia Malcolm (c. 1847–1920), Scottish suffragist, politician, first Scottish woman female councillor and first female Lord Provost
- Lavinia Masters, American activist
- Lavinia Meijer (born 1983), Dutch harpist
- Lavinia Mennuni (born 1976), Italian politician
- Lavinia Miloșovici (born 1976), Romanian Olympic gymnast
- Livinia Nixon, Australian TV personality
- Lavinia Ryves (1797–1871), impostor pretender
- Lavinia Silvério (born 2009), Brazilian rhythmic gymnast
- Lavinia Stan (born 1966), Romanian and Canadian political scientist
- Lavinia Șandru (born 1975), Romanian politician
- Lavinia Tagane (born 1991), Wallisian politician
- Lavinia Valbonesi (born 1998), Ecuadorian nutritionist, businesswoman and First Lady-designate of Ecuador
- Lavinia Veiongo (1879–1902), Queen consort of Tonga
- Lavínia Vlasak (born 1976), Brazilian actress
- Lavinia Warner (fl. 1979–present), British television producer
- Lavinia Warren (1841–1919), American dwarf circus performer
- Lavinia Williams (1916–1989), African-American dancer and dance educator

== See also ==
- Lavenia, a given name
