= Peter amicuscaridis =

Conservation status
- Vulnerable (IUCN 3.1)

Scientific classification
- Kingdom: Animalia
- Phylum: Chordata
- Class: Actinopterygii
- Order: Gobiiformes
- Family: Gobiidae
- Genus: Peter
- Species: P. amicuscaridis

Binomial name
- Peter amicuscaridis (Kovacic & Schliewen, 2008)

Synonyms
- Didogobius amicuscaridis

Species of fish

Peter amicuscardis is a species of marine fish in the family Gobiidae, the gobies. It is endemic to São Tomé and Príncipe, where it occurs at depths from 7 to 25 m (20 to 80 ft). The species was named and described by Kovačić and Schliewen in 2008.

== Description ==
The fish grows to maximum 3.2 cm (1.3 in) length. The fish are found in burrows of the shrimp Axiopsis serratifrons; its specific name amicuscaridis is a compound noun which means "friend of shrimps" in reference to this association. It feeds on sea snails from the families Scissurellidae, Rissoidae, and Limacinidae.
