= Alex Fox =

- Born: October 18, 1953 (age 71); Buenos Aires, Argentina
- Origin: North Miami Beach, Florida, United States
- Genres: New Flamenco, Instrumental, Latin, Jazz, World
- Occupation(s): Musician, Guitarist, Composer
- Instrument(s): Guitar, Vocals
- Years active: 1970-present
- Labels: Coco Musical, Alex Fox Productions
- Website: www.alexfox.com

Alex Fox (born October 18, 1953) is a guitarist.

Fox was born and raised in Buenos Aires, Argentina, where he was inspired by a broad range of artists ranging from Paco De Lucia, The Beatles, and The Gipsy Kings. Fox later received a scholarship to train with the director of the Teatro Colón Symphony Orchestra, an opportunity which signaled the start of his career as a conductor, teacher and composer. It was during this time that Fox honed his own unique style which blended, according to his official biography, "classical rumba".

Fox moved to Miami Florida, United States, in 1981 where he quickly established himself as a noted local artist in the South Beach area. In the 1990s, Alex's performances at the Breakerwater Hotel, South Beach, were so popular that the crowds stopped traffic.

His first album, To The Gypsies, was an independent production under his own label, Coco Musical, Inc. The album met with critical and commercial success worldwide, leading to the release of six more albums.

Highlights of his career include:

- A performance for US President Bill Clinton in 1997
- Work as a session musician on the Julio Iglesias release, La Carretera
- Opening act at the Istanbul Amphitheatre in 1999 for Tito Puente
- Featured act at the 2000 Bacardi Jazz Festival in Beirut

Fox's latest endeavor is the formation of the Fox Trio, featuring his sons Sebastian and David.

== Discography ==
=== Studio albums ===
- To The Gypsies (1994)
- Fly Away (1995)
- Malagueña (1996)
- C'est La Vie (1997)
- Personality (1998)
- Guitar On Fire (1999)
- Fox Trio (2001) (Alex Fox & Sons Sebastian & David)
- Influences (2006)

=== Video albums ===
- Guitars On Fire - Alex Fox in Concert (2012); DVD

== See also ==
- New Flamenco
- Flamenco rumba
