= Lavinia Burnett =

- Born: 1785; United States
- Died: November 8, 1845 (aged 59–60); Fayetteville, Arkansas, U.S.
- Spouse: Crawford Burnett
- Children: John, Minerva, others
- Status: Executed by hanging
- Conviction: First degree murder
- Penalty: Death

Lavinia Burnett (1785 - November 8, 1845) was the first woman to be executed by the state of Arkansas.

Born Lavinia May Sharp, she married Virginia native Crawford Burnett on December 29, 1810, in Patrick County. Sometime during the 1820s, they moved to Trigg County, Kentucky and lived in the home of Crawford's brother Cornelius. Sometime later, Lavinia and Crawford eventually settled in Arkansas. They had at least two children, John (b. 1811), and Minerva (b. 1820).

Lavinia and Crawford were arrested for the shooting murder of Jonathan Selby, who lived near Fayetteville and allegedly kept large sums of money at his residence. Their 15-year-old daughter Minerva and Hardin Sharp, Lavinia's brother or cousin, confessed to authorities that their relatives had planned Selby's murder, and John Burnett, Lavinia and Crawford's son, had carried it out.

Crawford Burnett's attorney made a motion before Crawford's trial to be dismissed as his attorney. This motion was granted. Crawford Burnett, being probably not guilty of the murder itself, refused to testify against his wife.

During Lavinia's trial, a motion to omit the testimony of one Hardin Sharp, a relative of Lavinia's, was denied. The motion was brought on behalf of Lavinia's attorney because it was said that Hardin was an accomplice to the murder.

Lavinia and Crawford were sentenced to death in October 1845. Their hangings were reportedly well attended. John Burnett, their son, had fled to Benton, Missouri, where he was arrested. He was found guilty on December 4, 1845, and hanged 22 days later on the same scaffold where his parents met their deaths.

The Prosecutor was Alfred Burton Greenwood. The defense attorneys were, Isaac Strain, James P. Neal and Isaac Murphy.

Hardin Sharp moved to Benton, Missouri where he married Lucinda Beck (1850 census) then both to Jobe, Missouri (1880 census). Minerva Burnett is said to have moved to Texas after the trial and hanging. Minerva (B. 26 Jan 1830 D. 29 Nov 1905 Wolf City TX) married Jonas W. Williams (B. 18 May 1818 D. 18 Dec 1883 Wolf City TX) two years after her parents death.
