= C'est la Vie (Henri Dikongué album) =

Studio album by Henri Dikongué
- Released: 1997
- Label: Tinder
- Producer: Gilles Fruchaux

Henri Dikongué chronology
Wa (You) (1995)	C'est la Vie (1997)	Mot'a Babe (2000)

C'est la Vie is an album by the Cameroonian musician Henri Dikongué. It was released in 1997.

The album was dedicated to Fela Kuti and Robert Mitchum. It was a success on European world music charts, and sold more than 9,000 copies in its first month of release. Dikongué promoted it by touring North America.

== Production ==
The album was produced by Gilles Fruchaux. The title track was sung in French; Dikongué wrote all of the album's songs, and also played classical guitar. Dikongué was influenced by the sound of bossa nova.

== Critical reception ==
Professional ratings
Review scores
Source	Rating
AllMusic	4/5 stars
Robert Christgau	A−
Los Angeles Times	3/4 stars
MusicHound World: The Essential Album Guide	4/5 stars

JazzTimes noted that "Dikongue's musical turf isn’t the dance-driven world of intensely rhythmic West African styles, but a softer melange, grounded in elements of Brazilian influences and a general emphasis on acoustic instruments." Robert Christgau wrote that Dikongué is "what happens when Afropop becomes world music—when it targets broad-minded European connoisseurs rather than rhythm-schooled African sophisticates." The Indianapolis Star opined that Dikongué "has a most gorgeous, lilting folk sound."

The Washington Post stated that "Dikongue's distinctive style melds classical guitar, Latin-jazz balladry and French chansons." The Orange County Register praised Dikongué's "sweetly suave style," writing that he "crafts low-key, folk- and jazz-infused Afro-pop."

AllMusic wrote: "Offering an interesting alternative to zouk and makossa, Cameroon's Henri Dikongue favors an introspective, sensitive and ballad-heavy approach on C'est la Vie."

== Track listing ==
No.	Title	Length
1.	"Ndutu"
2.	"Ndol'asu"
3.	"C'est la Vie"
4.	"Na Tem Ité Idiba"
5.	"Na Teleye Owa Ngea"
6.	"We Nde Mba"
7.	"Bulu Bo Windi Tenge"
8.	"Françoise"
9.	"A Mumi"
10.	"Wen Te Mba Wenge"
11.	"Douala"
