= Data format =

Data format in information technology may refer to:

- Data type, constraint placed upon the interpretation of data in a type system
- Signal (electrical engineering), a format for signal data used in signal processing
- Recording format, a format for encoding data for storage on a storage medium
- File format, a format for encoding data for storage in a computer file
  - Container format (digital), a format for encoding data for storage by means of a standardized audio/video codecs file format
- Content format, a format for representing media content as data
  - Audio format, a format for encoded sound data
  - Video format, a format for encoded video data
