= Lavie (automobile) =

1904 French automobile

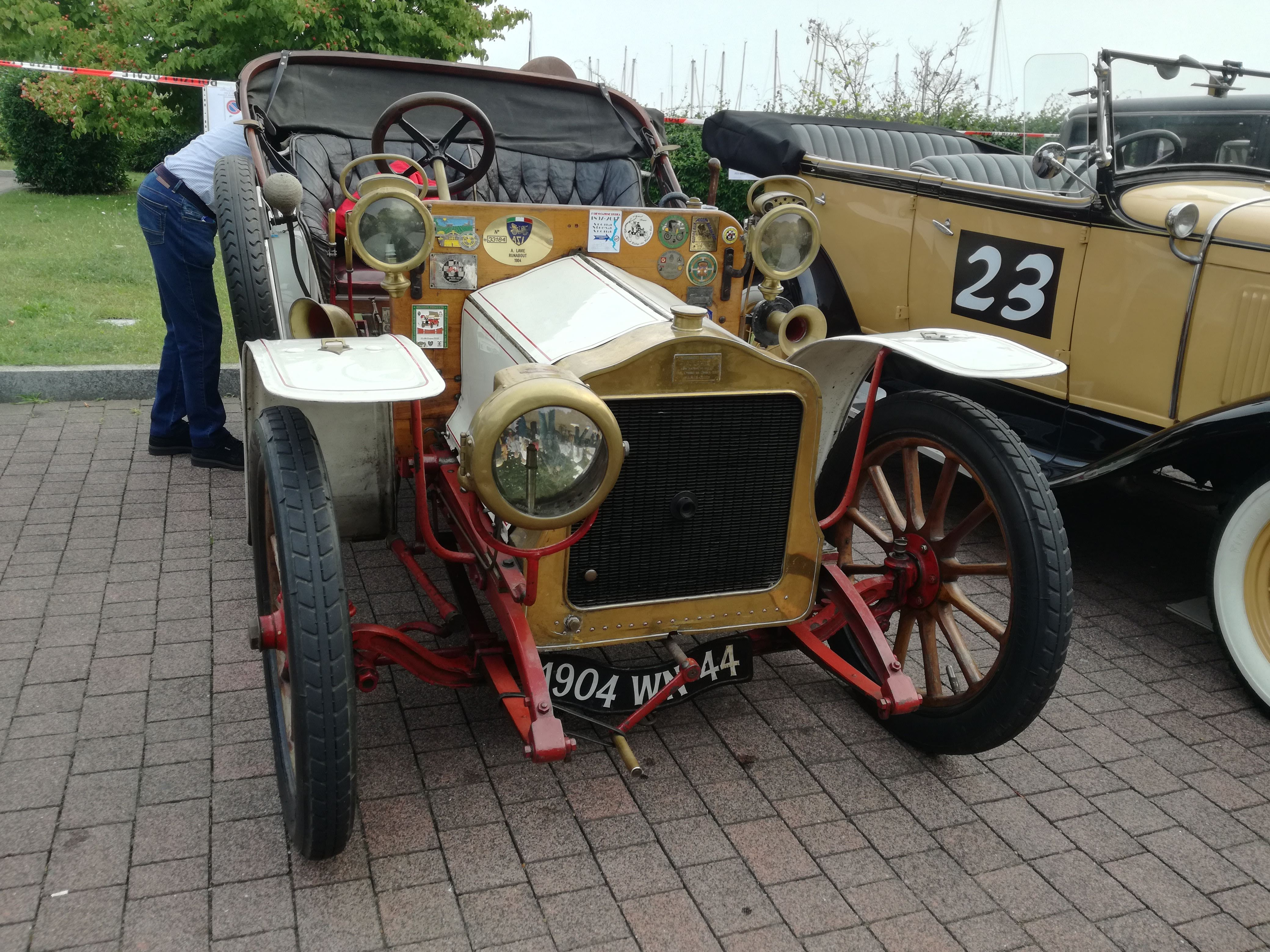
The last Lavie.

The Lavie was a French automobile manufactured in Paris around 1904. The company produced a few 6cv twin-cylinder voiturettes; one is reported to survive.
