= C'est La Vie (Phosphorescent album) =

Studio album by Phosphorescent
- Released: October 5, 2018
- Studios: Spirit Sounds, Nashville
- Genres: Indie rock, indie pop, indie folk, alternative country, psychedelic pop
- Length: 46:05
- Label: Dead Oceans

Phosphorescent chronology
Muchacho (2013)	C'est La Vie (2018)	Revelator (2024)

C'est La Vie is the seventh studio album by Phosphorescent. The album was released on Dead Oceans on October 5, 2018.

== Release ==
On July 30, 2018, Matthew Houck - under his stage name Phosphorescent - announced the release of his seventh album, along with the first single "New Birth in New England".

== Critical reception ==
Professional ratings
Aggregate scores
Source	Rating
Metacritic	80/100
Review scores
Source	Rating
AllMusic	3.5/5 stars
Exclaim!	8/10
The Guardian	4/5 stars
The Line of Best Fit	8.5/10
Paste	8.2/10
Pitchfork	7.6/10
The Skinny	4/5 stars
Slant Magazine	3.5/5 stars
Under the Radar	8/10

C'est La Vie was met with "generally favorable" reviews from critics. At Metacritic, which assigns a weighted average rating out of 100 to reviews from mainstream publications, this release received an average score of 80 based on 19 reviews. Aggregator Album of the Year gave the release a 76 out of 100 based on a critical consensus of 21 reviews.

== Track listing ==
No.	Title	Length
1.	"Black Moon / Silver Waves"	1:16
2.	"C'est La Vie No.2"	3:26
3.	"New Birth in New England"	5:00
4.	"There from Here"	5:21
5.	"Around the Horn"	8:11
6.	"Christmas Down Under"	6:17
7.	"My Beautiful Boy"	5:46
8.	"These Rocks"	4:26
9.	"Black Waves / Silver Moon"	6:22
Total length:		46:05

== Charts ==
Chart performance for C'est La Vie
Chart (2018)	Peak position
Scottish Albums (Official Charts)	37
Belgian Albums (Ultratop Flanders)	89
Dutch Albums (Album Top 100)	130
UK Americana Albums (Official Charts)	1
UK Independent Albums (Official Charts)	16
US Independent Albums (Billboard)	12
US Top Folk Albums (Billboard)	16

== Personnel ==
Credits adapted from AllMusic

Musicians

- Matthew Houck – primary artist, vocals, producer
- Ricky Ray Jackson – guitar
- Luke Reynolds – guitar
- Christopher Marine – drums
- Kevin Black – bass
- Jo Schornikow – accordion, piano
- Scott Stapleton – piano
- Dave Roe – bass
- Rustine Bragaw – bass
- Alexis Saski – backing vocals
- Maureen Murphy – backing vocals
- Kyshona Armstrong – backing vocals
- Nicole Boggs – backing vocals

Production

- Richard Dodd – mastering
- Vance Powell – engineer
- Andrija Tokic – engineer
