= Lavy =

Lavy is a surname. Notable people with the surname include:

- Thomas Lavy (1941–1995), American farmer
- Victor Lavy, Israeli economist

== As nickname ==
- Lavy Pinto (1929–2020), Indian sprinter

== See also ==
- Lavie (disambiguation)
- Lavies
