= La Viña, Catamarca =

Coordinates: 28°02′S 65°34′W

La Viña (Catamarca)
- Municipality and village
- Interactive map of La Viña (Catamarca)
- Country: Argentina
- Province: Catamarca Province
- Time zone: UTC−3 (ART)

La Viña (Catamarca) is a village and municipality in Catamarca Province in northwestern Argentina.
