= Muchacho (album) =

Studio album by Phosphorescent
- Released: March 19, 2013
- Recorded: Greenpoint, Brooklyn, New York
- Genres: Indie rock, indie pop, indie folk, alternative country, psychedelic pop
- Length: 46:28
- Label: Dead Oceans
- Producer: Matthew Houck

Phosphorescent chronology
Here's to Taking It Easy (2010)	Muchacho (2013)	C'est La Vie (2018)

Muchacho (Spanish for "boy") is the sixth studio album by American indie rock act Phosphorescent, released on March 19, 2013, on Dead Oceans. Self-produced by Matthew Houck, the album was preceded by the single "Song for Zula". "Song for Zula" was also featured in The Spectacular Now, The Amazing Spider-Man 2, and the series finale of Superstore: "All Sales Final".

Muchacho's lyrical content was inspired by the various events that followed his tour in support of previous studio album, Here's to Taking It Easy (2010).

Released to widespread critical acclaim, the album reached fifty-nine on the Billboard 200 and fifty-eight on the UK Albums Chart.

== Background and recording ==
In 2012, Matthew Houck was forced, due to New York City re-zoning, to disassemble his studio in the Navy Yards area of Brooklyn, New York, and subsequently moved to Greenpoint, where he began work on Muchacho in his reassembled studio. Regarding his new recording space, Houck noted, "It's not so much a 'studio' as it is a junky practice space – no professionals would ever walk in there and be like, 'Whoa'."

The album was influenced by Houck's experiences on tour in support of his previous album, Here's to Taking It Easy (2010), and its aftermath, with Houck stating: "The last time I was on the road, I thought, 'Just a few more months, and then I’ll go home and tend to everything.' But when I got back, everything was too far gone to fix, so there was fallout. Losing my place [in the Navy Yards] was a big deal. It’s a big space, and over the years I acquired a decent amount of gear. New York is a beast, man, it’s hard to find a place to do music unless you’re going to soundproof it. Relationships are tough when you're on the road, too – my girlfriend would come on some of the tours, but it wasn't easy. Drugs and booze were involved. So I lost the place, lost the girl, and lost my mind."

Houck subsequently put recording as Phosphorescent on hiatus stating, "I put Phosphorescent on hold, outside of on tour, for about a year. I don’t think it’s normal to shut down from record to record, but I wanted to do that. I wasn’t sure if I was going to make another Phosphorescent record at that time."

The majority of Muchacho's material was recorded at Houck's home studio, with Houck noting, "I had the luxury of building a studio and playing around with sounds for an entire year. [...] "Muchacho's Tune" was the first song I worked on, and the production was inspired by Brian Eno's Apollo: Atmospheres and Soundtracks. That record sounds very moon-bouncy to me, and I figured that sound would couple well with some Mexican cantina-type stuff, to my ears at least."

== Writing and composition ==
Regarding the album's title, Matthew Houck stated: "If you see someone who is getting uppity, you might just say to them, 'Hey, muchacho, settle down.' I was in Mexico, by myself, feeling pretty raw, and I remembered a line in a Neruda poem somewhere. I can’t even remember what it was, but it was something like, 'This is how it is, muchacho.' That kept resonating to me – like, 'You better handle it. This is how it is, muchacho.'

Regarding the tracks contained within Muchacho, Houck noted, "My life, to be honest, sort of fell apart. And in the process of getting it back together, these songs came. I couldn't ignore them."

== Artwork ==
The album's artwork features photographs, by Dustin Condren, of a smiling Matthew Houck alongside female companions in states of undress. Regarding these images, Houck noted, "I wouldn't call [the] album cover 'happy'. There’s a messy desperation going on there. It shows that you can be happy when you’re a wreck."

== Critical reception ==
Professional ratings
Aggregate scores
Source	Rating
AnyDecentMusic?	7.8/10
Metacritic	85/100
Review scores
Source	Rating
AllMusic	4/5 stars
American Songwriter	4/5 stars
The A.V. Club	A−
Consequence of Sound	4/5 stars
The Independent	4/5 stars
Mojo	4/5 stars
Paste	9.3/10
Pitchfork	8.8/10
Q	4/5 stars
Uncut	8/10

Muchacho received critical acclaim from music critics. At Metacritic, which assigns a weighted average score out of 100 to reviews and ratings from mainstream critics, the album received a metascore of 85, based on 26 reviews. The breakdown was 24 positive reviews to only two mixed reviews with no negative reviews.

AllMusic's Fred Thomas found that "what is clear, even through the sometimes heavier-than-necessary arrangements, is that Muchacho has some of Houck's best songwriting since his early days, seemingly tapped into the grainy pain, hard-living tendencies, and wandering muse of his subconscious with the most listenable results Phosphorescent has produced in years." At American Songwriter, Jeff Terich wrote that "Muchacho never stays in one place for too long", and that Houck "can do a tender, dreamy pop song, or he can plug in and just get straight to rocking". Austin L. Ray of The A.V. Club graded the album an A−, and called it "Houck's most accomplished release to date" that is at its core "most heartrending and life-affirming, equal parts lost-love devastation and hip-swaying, horn-led exultation." The Line of Best Fit's Janne Oinonen rated the album eight-stars, and said it is a "rewarding gem" even "despite its decidedly downbeat subject material," that "hops effortlessly over various woe-is-me traps".

At Clash, Peter Adkins affirmed that "this is no outing in kitsch" because it is "a beautiful outing in hauntingly pastoral heartbreak" that he vowed is "impressive." Consequence of Sound's Mike Madden saw the album as a "well balanced listen, one that finds Houck adding new hues to old canvases and striking gold at every turn." Daniel Kohn of Filter gave the album an 82 percent, and found that the album contains "experimental beauties". In more agreement, Beats Per Minute's Rob Hakimian gave the album an 84 percent, and stated that "Muchacho feels like the next link in a state of anguish", but it is not bad "because it seems like there's plenty more gold to be mined from those depths." At The Independent, Andy Gill said that Houck "augments his usual reedy Americana stylings with some unexpected developments on Muchacho." John Murphy of musicOMH vowed that "it's impossible not to believe that Matthew Houck has created his finest work yet", which this release "deserves...to propel him into the mainstream at last." At Mojo, Sylvie Simmons called it "a hell of a production."

At Paste, Nathan Huffstutter noted that "powerfully, the evolution of the songcraft on Muchacho doesn't arrive as a random left turn but instead progresses directly out of Phosphorescent’s own canon." Jayson Greene of Pitchfork rated the album 8.8-out-of-ten, and affirmed that "on Muchacho, Houck invests this world with new beauty and profundity." Chris Catchpole of Q felt that "while the more traditional sounding songs that remain are unquestionably excellent, it does seem odd to leave such a good idea only half explored." At Under the Radar, Jim Scott called "Muchacho is an artist setting a new standard." The two seven-out-of-ten ratings come from No Ripcord and This Is Fake DIY. No Ripcord's James McKenna found that "there probably aren't enough moments that make the hairs on the back of your neck stand up, but after the initial struggle to get into, it’s a rewarding record to return to. So it's at least worth a listen." Danny Wright of This Is Fake DIY evoked how "'Muchacho' is a record which can soothe even the darkest nights and moods." At Uncut, Peter Watts found that Phosphorescent on Muchacho is "mixing country jams with claustrophobic electronica and mournful Mariachi horns to create a beautiful but discomforting album."

However, the album has three mixed reviews, which one came from a non-Metacritic magazine The Skinny, which gave it a three-star rating, and the others a six-out-of-ten. At Exclaim!, Joshua Kloke found that it's not at all a "raucous centrepiece", but rather a "soundtrack for a nightcap alone though?", which he said "Absolutely." Matthew Fiander of PopMatters noted how this "album about the ways in which we recover, the ways in which we find ourselves after feeling loss. It’s also an album that, musically, full of fitful and exciting exploration." Yet, Fiander criticized that "Muchacho sometimes confuses the personal with the insular." At The Skinny, Illya Kuryakin highlighted that the album is "experimental and ambitious", but called "the album's highlights are sublime, even if the rest feels somewhat lost in the desert."

== Track listing ==
All tracks are written by Matthew Houck.

No.	Title	Length
1.	"Sun, Arise! (An Invocation, an Introduction)"	3:09
2.	"Song for Zula"	6:10
3.	"Ride On/Right On"	3:44
4.	"Terror in the Canyons (The Wounded Master)"	4:05
5.	"A Charm/A Blade"	5:20
6.	"Muchacho's Tune"	4:19
7.	"A New Anhedonia"	4:03
8.	"The Quotidian Beasts"	7:04
9.	"Down to Go"	5:16
10.	"Sun's Arising (A Koan, an Exit)"	3:18
Total length:		46:28

== Personnel ==
=== Musicians ===
- Matthew Houck – vocals, guitars (3, 4, 5, 6, 7, 8, 9 and 10), electric lead guitar (8), organ (3 and 5), electric keys (7), bounce keys (6), instruments (1), drum n' bass n' fiddle loops (2), beats (3), percussion (3, 4, 7, 8 and 10), shakers (5), rattlers (5)
- Jeff Bailey – bass guitar (2, 3, 4, 5, 6, 7, 8 and 9)
- Bobby Hawk – fiddle (2, 4, 5, 6, 7 and 8), stings (9)
- Ricky Ray Jackson – pedal steel (2, 4, 5, 6, 7, 8 and 9), electric lead guitar (4 and 8)
- Scott Stapleton – piano (4, 5 and 8), synthesizer (2 and 4), clavinet (5)
- Jo Schornikow – piano (6, 7 and 9)
- Christopher Marine – drums (2, 4, 5, 7 and 8), bongo drums (5)
- Kyle Resnick – trumpet (4, 5, 6, 7 and 9)
- Benjamin Lanz – trombone (4, 5, 6, 7 and 9)
- Jon Natchez – bass saxophone (4 and 5), bass clarinet (6, 7 and 9)
- David Torch – bongo drums and percussion (4), conga drum (5)

=== Recording personnel ===
- Matthew Houck – producer, engineer, mixing
- John Agnello – mixing (2, 4, 5, 6, 7, 8 and 9)
- Pete Bischoff – engineer (5 and 6)
- Phil Joly – "final pass" engineer
- Greg Calbi – mastering

=== Artwork ===
- Dusdin Condren – photography
- Matthew Houck – art direction
- Daniel Murphy – text and layout

== Charts ==
Chart (2013)	Peak position
Belgian Albums Chart	24
Swedish Albums Chart	50
Irish Albums Chart	68
UK Albums Chart	58
UK Independent Albums Chart	14
US Billboard 200	59
US Independent Albums	11
US Folk Albums	5
US Top Rock Albums	22
US Tastemakers	10
