= Phosphorescent (musician) =

American singer-songwriter

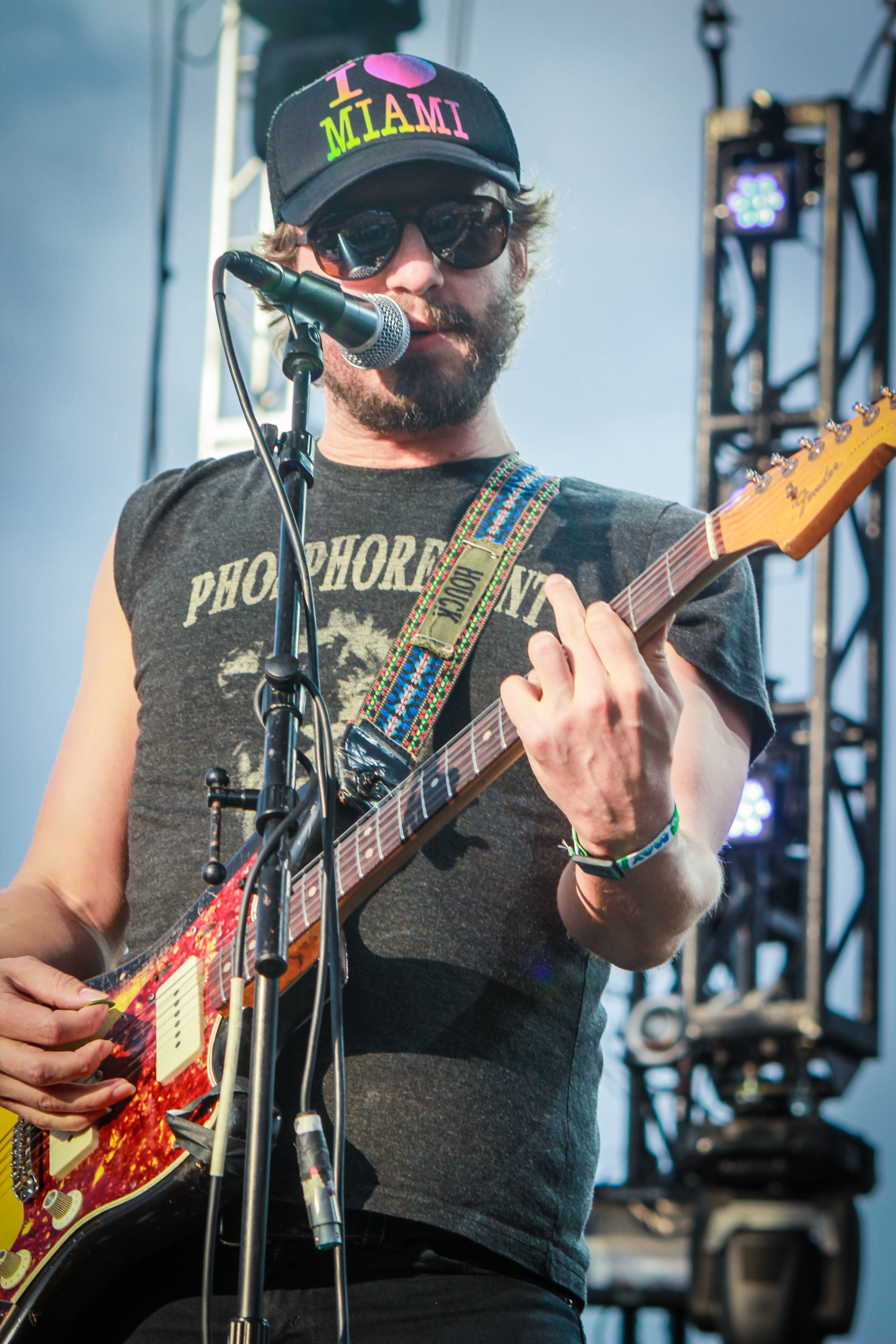
- Phosphorescent performing at Sasquatch Music Festival in 2014

Background information
- Origin: Athens, Georgia, United States
- Genres: Americana; alternative country; indie folk; folk rock
- Instruments: Vocals; guitar; piano; bass; drums; ukulele
- Years active: 2001–present
- Labels: Verve; Dead Oceans; Misra; Warm
- Website: phosphorescentmusic.com

Phosphorescent is the stage name of American singer-songwriter Matthew Houck. Originally from Huntsville, Alabama, Houck began recording and performing under this nickname in 2001 in Athens, Georgia. He is currently based in Nashville, Tennessee.

== Overview ==
Before recording under the name Phosphorescent, Matthew Houck toured under the name Fillup Shack and self-released a limited pressing of the album Hipolit in 2000. Houck later changed his stage name to Phosphorescent and released the full-length LP A Hundred Times or More in 2003 through Athens, Georgia-based independent label Warm Records. The following year, he released the EP The Weight of Flight. Phosphorescent rose to wider critical acclaim after releasing Aw Come Aw Wry in August 2005 and Pride in October 2007. The latter was named the 12th best album of 2007 by Stylus Magazine and received an 8.0 rating from the online indie magazine Pitchfork. In 2009, inspired by Willie Nelson's tribute album to Lefty Frizzell To Lefty from Willie, Houck crafted a tribute album to Nelson himself entitled To Willie, released through Dead Oceans. Phosphorescent released Here's to Taking It Easy in 2010.

Muchacho, Phosphorescent's sixth studio album, was released in 2013 to critical acclaim. The full studio album C'est La Vie followed in 2018.

In January 2024, Phosphorescent announced his new album Revelator, to be released in April on Verve Records. For the first time, it features a song written by someone other than Houck - his partner and collaborator, Jo Schornikow.

== Discography ==
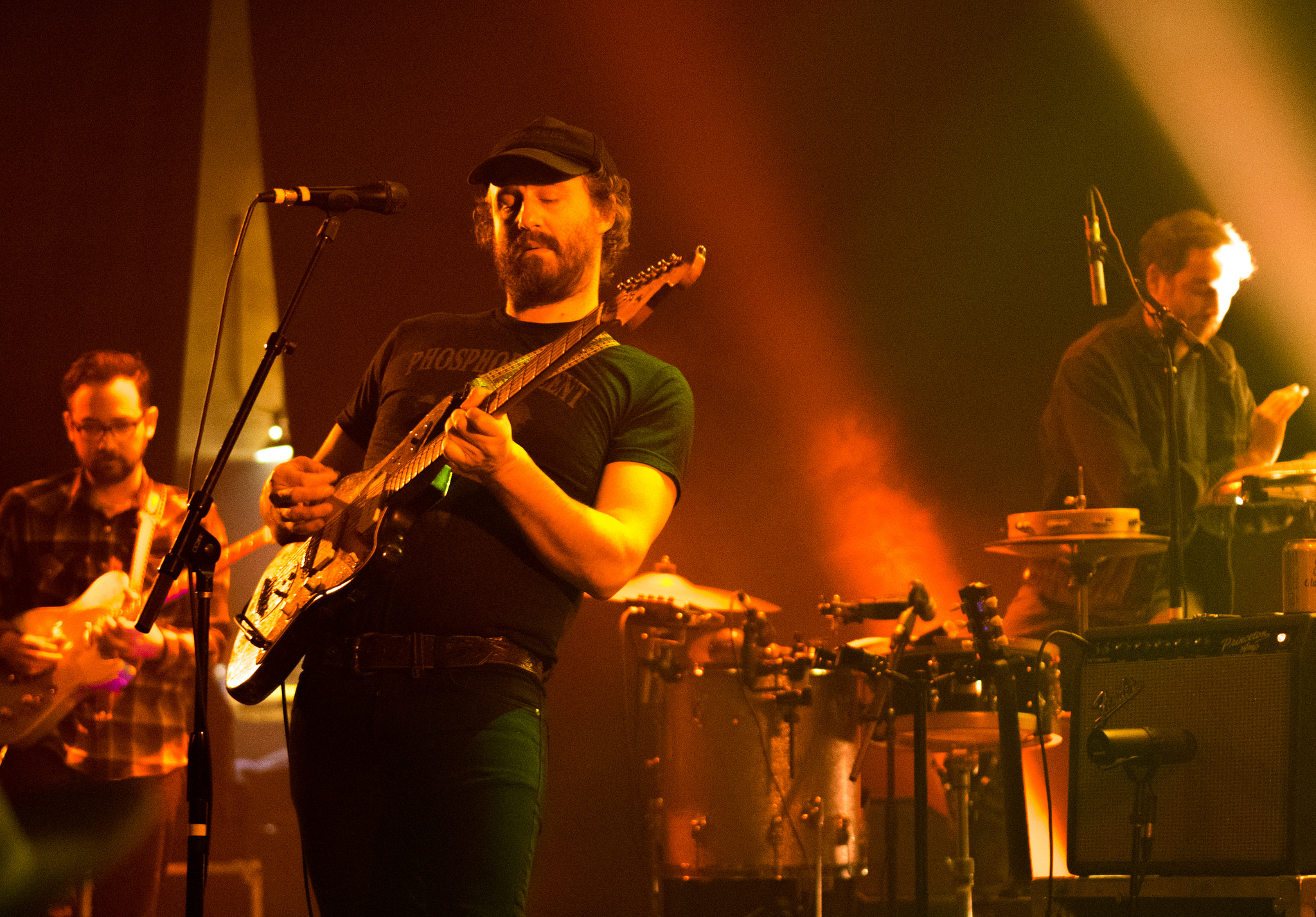
Phosphorescent performs in Colorado, Nov. 2018

=== Studio albums ===
Year	Title	Label
2003	A Hundred Times or More	Warm
2004	The Weight of Flight EP	Warm
2005	Aw Come Aw Wry	Misra
2007	Pride	Dead Oceans
2009	To Willie	Dead Oceans
2010	Here's to Taking It Easy	Dead Oceans
2013	Muchacho	Dead Oceans
2015	Live at the Music Hall	Dead Oceans
2018	C'est La Vie	Dead Oceans
2022	The Full Moon Project	Calldown Music
2024	Revelator	Verve Records

=== Singles and other releases ===
Year	Title	Label	Description
2005	"I Am a Full Grown Man (I Will Lay in the Grass All Day)"	The Great Pop Supplement	UK limited 7" release
2010	Live / Ghost Lights EP	Dead Oceans	Limited-press tour EP
2021	The BBC Sessions	Bandcamp	Digital Album
2022	Trying to get to Heaven	Trying to get to Heaven	Single

=== Compilation appearances ===
Year	Compilation	Song
2003	Esopus Magazine Number 1 Public Domain	"Home on the Range" (trad.)
2006	Awful Bliss Records: Songs For Another Place	"One of My Turns" (Pink Floyd)
2009	Live at KEXP Vol.5	"Wolves" (solo, live)
2009	Splice Today: The Old Lonesome Sound	"Old Folks at Home (Swanee River)"(Stephen Foster)
2009	St. Ives Records: It Happened Here	"South (Of America)" (live)
2010	MOJO Magazine: Let It Be – Revisited	"Across the Universe"(Beatles)
2010	More Townes Van Zandt by the Great Unknown	"Why She's Acting This Way"(Townes Van Zandt)
2011	MOJO Magazine: Harvest – Revisited	"Are You Ready for the Country?"(Neil Young)
2011	Margin Call Soundtrack	"Wolves"
2014	The Amazing Spider-Man 2 Soundtrack	"Song For Zula"
2016	Day of the Dead Compilation	"Sugaree" (Grateful Dead)
2019	Matthias et Maxime by Xavier Dolan Soundtrack	"Song For Zula"
2021	Can't Get You Out of My Head - Part 6: Are We Pigeon? Are We Dancer? by Adam Curtis Soundtrack	"Song For Zula"
