= La vie =

La vie may refer to:

- La Vie (painting), a painting by Pablo Picasso
- La Vie (magazine) (formerly La Vie catholique), a Roman Catholic weekly published in France
- La Vie, the annual student yearbook published by Pennsylvania State University
- LaVie (computer), a laptop computer manufactured by NEC and Lenovo
- Flyscooters La Vie, a brand of motor scooter

== See also ==
- C'est la vie (disambiguation)
- La Vie en rose (disambiguation)
- Life (disambiguation)
