= Dahris Martin =

American writer

Dahris Butterworth Martin (November 17, 1900 – July 1980) was an American writer, from Vermont in the United States, the daughter of John D. Martin. Martin's mother's first name is unknown, but her maiden name was Butterworth. Her family origins lay in Maghera, County Londonderry, Ireland. She is best known for her 1937 travel book on Tunisia, Among the Faithful. Martin was born in New York state and studied at Columbia University. She worked for a while at the publishing house Doubleday. In 1925, she left for Europe and lived in France and Switzerland. In 1926, she moved to Tunisia where she met her future husband Harry Shokler (1896-1978), an American artist and print-maker.

Martin's most famous book Among the Faithful was first published in London in 1937, in New York in 1943 as "I Know Tunisia" and is still in print. Her children's books include:

- Adventure in Ireland
- Adventure in Tunisia: The Fair at Kairwan
- Awisha's Carpet
- Fatma Was a Goose
- Little Lamb
- The Wonder Cat
