= Livi =

Livi or Līvi may refer to:

- Līvi (band), a Latvian hard rock band
- Līvi, Biksti Parish, a village in Latvia
- Livi (healthcare service), a healthcare service in France and the United Kingdom
- Livingston F.C., a Scottish association football club nicknamed Livi

== Feminine given name ==
- Livi Michael (born 1960), British fiction writer
- Livi Sheldon (born 1994), English personal trainer and bodybuilder
- Livi Zheng (born 1989), Indonesian film producer and director

== People with the surname ==
- Alessandro Livi (born 1982), Italian footballer
- Barbara Livi (born 1973), Italian actor of cinema, television, and theatre
- Grazia Livi (1930–2015), Italian author and journalist
- Ivo Livi, birth name of Yves Montand (1921-1991), Italian-French actor and singer
- Jean-Louis Livi (born 1941), French film producer, nephew of Yves Montand
- Massimo Livi Bacci (born 1936), Italian politician and statistician
- Piero Livi (1925–2015), Italian director and screenwriter
- Ridolfo Livi (1856–1920), Italian anthropologist

== See also ==
- Livy (Titus Livius), a Roman historian
