= John the Revelator (disambiguation) =

John the Revelator (John of Patmos) is the traditional author of the Book of Revelation, the final book of the New Testament.

John the Revelator may also refer to:

- "John the Revelator" (folk/blues song), a traditional American folk blues song first recorded by Blind Willie Johnson in 1930
- "John the Revelator / Lilian", a 2006 single by Depeche Mode
- "JTR" (song), a Dave Matthews Band song based on an earlier song by the band called "John the Revelator" (different from the American folk song)
