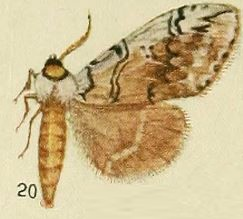

Scientific classification
- Kingdom: Animalia
- Phylum: Arthropoda
- Clade: Pancrustacea
- Class: Insecta
- Order: Lepidoptera
- Superfamily: Noctuoidea
- Family: Notodontidae
- Genus: Eulavinia; Fletcher, 1980
- Species: E. lavinia

Binomial name
- Eulavinia lavinia (Fawcett, 1916)

Synonyms
- Lavinia Kiriakoff, 1962 (preoccupied); Phalera lavinia Fawcett, 1916; Lavinia lavinia (Fawcett, 1916)

= Eulavinia =

Genus of moth

Eulavinia is a monotypic moth genus in the family Notodontidae. Its only species, Eulavinia lavinia, is found in Kenya. The species was first described by James Farish Malcolm Fawcett in 1916.
