= C'est ça, la vie =

- Country of origin: Germany
- No. of seasons: 2
- No. of episodes: 26

Original release
- Network: Bayerischer Rundfunk

C'est ça, la vie was a German educational television series produced by Bayerischer Rundfunk, teaching French as a foreign or second language to German viewers. An extension of the instruction presented earlier in the Bon Courage series, this series was divided into two parts of 13 episodes each, focusing on the use of the French language in business.

== See also ==
- List of German television series
