= Revelator (Phosphorescent album) =

Studio album by Phosphorescent
- Released: April 5, 2024
- Studio: Matthew Houck's home studio (Nashville)
- Length: 45:35
- Label: Verve

Phosphorescent chronology
C'est La Vie (2018)	Revelator (2024)

Singles from Revelator
- 1. "Revelator" Released: January 24, 2024

Revelator is the eighth studio album by American band Phosphorescent, released on April 5, 2024, as their label debut on Verve Records and their first studio album in six years, following C'est La Vie (2018).

== Background ==
Lead member Matthew Houck recorded the album at his Nashville studio over the course of six months. Houck considers the album the best he has ever written, as it explores "unspoken truths" that come in the process of "navigating home, partnership, and family". It features contributions from Jack Lawrence of the Raconteurs, Jim White of Dirty Three and his partner Jo Schornikow. The latter wrote the song "The World Is Ending" which marks the first song in the history of Phosphorescent not written by Houck. Revelator is set to be the band's debut album on Verve Records, after having released five albums under Dead Oceans. On January 23, 2024, Houck debuted several songs from the record at The Bitter End in New York City before announcing the album the following day, alongside the release of the eponymous lead single. Houck calls "Revelator" the "best song" he has ever written that made him realize that he is in the process of writing an entirely new album.

== Critical reception ==
=== Year-end lists ===
Select year-end rankings for Revelator
Publication/critic	Accolade	Rank	Ref.
Uncut	80 Best Albums of 2024	24	

== Track listing ==
Revelator track listing
No.	Title	Length
1.	"Revelator"	4:53
2.	"The World Is Ending"	3:39
3.	"Fences"	4:08
4.	"Impossible House"	4:35
5.	"Wide As Heaven"	5:45
6.	"A Moon Behind the Clouds"	6:10
7.	"All The Same"	4:51
8.	"A Poem on the Men's Room Wall"	4:39
9.	"To Get It Right"	6:55
Total length:		45:35

== Charts ==
Chart performance for Revelator
Chart (2024)	Peak position
Belgian Albums (Ultratop Flanders)	177
Greek Albums (IFPI)	61
Scottish Albums (OCC)	35
UK Album Downloads (OCC)	73
UK Americana Albums (OCC)	9
