= Lavenia =

Lavenia as a given name may refer to:

- Lavenia Padarath (1944/1945–2019), Fijian politician
- Lavenia Tinai (born 1990), Fijian rugby union player

== See also ==
- Lavena (disambiguation)
- Lavina (disambiguation)
