= Lavies =

Lavies is a surname. Notable people with this surname include:

- Hubert Lavies (1833–1905), American farmer
- Peter Lavies (1790–1876), American farmer, tavernkeeper, and moneylender

== See also ==
- Davies
- Lavy
- Lavie (disambiguation)
