= La Vina, California =

La Vina
- Census-designated place
- Location in Madera County, California

- Location within California
- Coordinates: 36°52′50″N 120°06′38″W
- Country: United States
- State: California
- County: Madera

Area
  - Total: 0.101 sq mi (0.261 km^{2})
  - Land: 0.101 sq mi (0.261 km^{2})
  - Water: 0 sq mi (0 km^{2}) 0%
- Elevation: 230 ft (70 m)

Population (2020)
  - Total: 637
  - Density: 6,320/sq mi (2,440/km^{2})
- Time zone: UTC-8 (Pacific (PST))
  - Summer (DST): UTC-7 (PDT)
- ZIP Code: 93637 (Madera)
- GNIS feature IDs: 226721; 2628749
- FIPS Code: 06-40872

La Vina (Spanish: La Viña, meaning "The Vine") is a census-designated place in Madera County, California, United States. It is located 8 miles (13 km) by road south-southwest of Madera, at an elevation of 230 feet (70 m). The population was 637 at the 2020 census, up from 279 in 2010.

A post office operated at La Vina from 1891 to 1895.

== Geography ==
According to the United States Census Bureau, the CDP has a total area of 0.1 square miles (0.3 km^{2}), all land.

== Demographics ==
Historical population
Census	Pop.	Note	%±
2010	279		—
2020	637		128.3%
U.S. Decennial Census; 2010

La Vina first appeared as a census designated place in the 2010 U.S. census.

The 2020 United States census reported that La Vina had a population of 637. The population density was 6,306.9 inhabitants per square mile (2,435.1/km^{2}). The racial makeup of La Vina was 172 (27.0%) White, 3 (0.5%) African American, 41 (6.4%) Native American, 0 (0.0%) Asian, 0 (0.0%) Pacific Islander, 306 (48.0%) from other races, and 115 (18.1%) from two or more races. Hispanic or Latino of any race were 590 persons (92.6%).

The whole population lived in households. There were 153 households, out of which 82 (53.6%) had children under the age of 18 living in them, 87 (56.9%) were married-couple households, 13 (8.5%) were cohabiting couple households, 30 (19.6%) had a female householder with no partner present, and 23 (15.0%) had a male householder with no partner present. 11 households (7.2%) were one person, and 5 (3.3%) were one person aged 65 or older. The average household size was 4.16. There were 131 families (85.6% of all households).

The age distribution was 206 people (32.3%) under the age of 18, 73 people (11.5%) aged 18 to 24, 139 people (21.8%) aged 25 to 44, 154 people (24.2%) aged 45 to 64, and 65 people (10.2%) who were 65 years of age or older. The median age was 29.1 years. For every 100 females, there were 113.0 males.

There were 161 housing units at an average density of 1,594.1 units per square mile (615.5 units/km^{2}), of which 153 (95.0%) were occupied. Of these, 53 (34.6%) were owner-occupied, and 100 (65.4%) were occupied by renters.
