= La Vie en rose (disambiguation) =

"La Vie en rose" is a song by Édith Piaf.

La Vie en rose may also refer to:

- La Vie En Rose (album), a 1989 album by D'erlanger
- "La Vie en Rose" (Iz*One song), 2018
- La Vie en Rose (film), a 2007 biographical film about Édith Piaf starring Marion Cotillard
- La Vie en Rose (painting), a 1979 artwork by Joan Mitchell
- "La Vie en Rose", a song by Buck-Tick from the album Tenshi no Revolver

== See also ==
- Boutique La Vie en Rose, a chain of lingerie stores
- Ma vie en rose (film)
