= Kunsthalle Bremen =

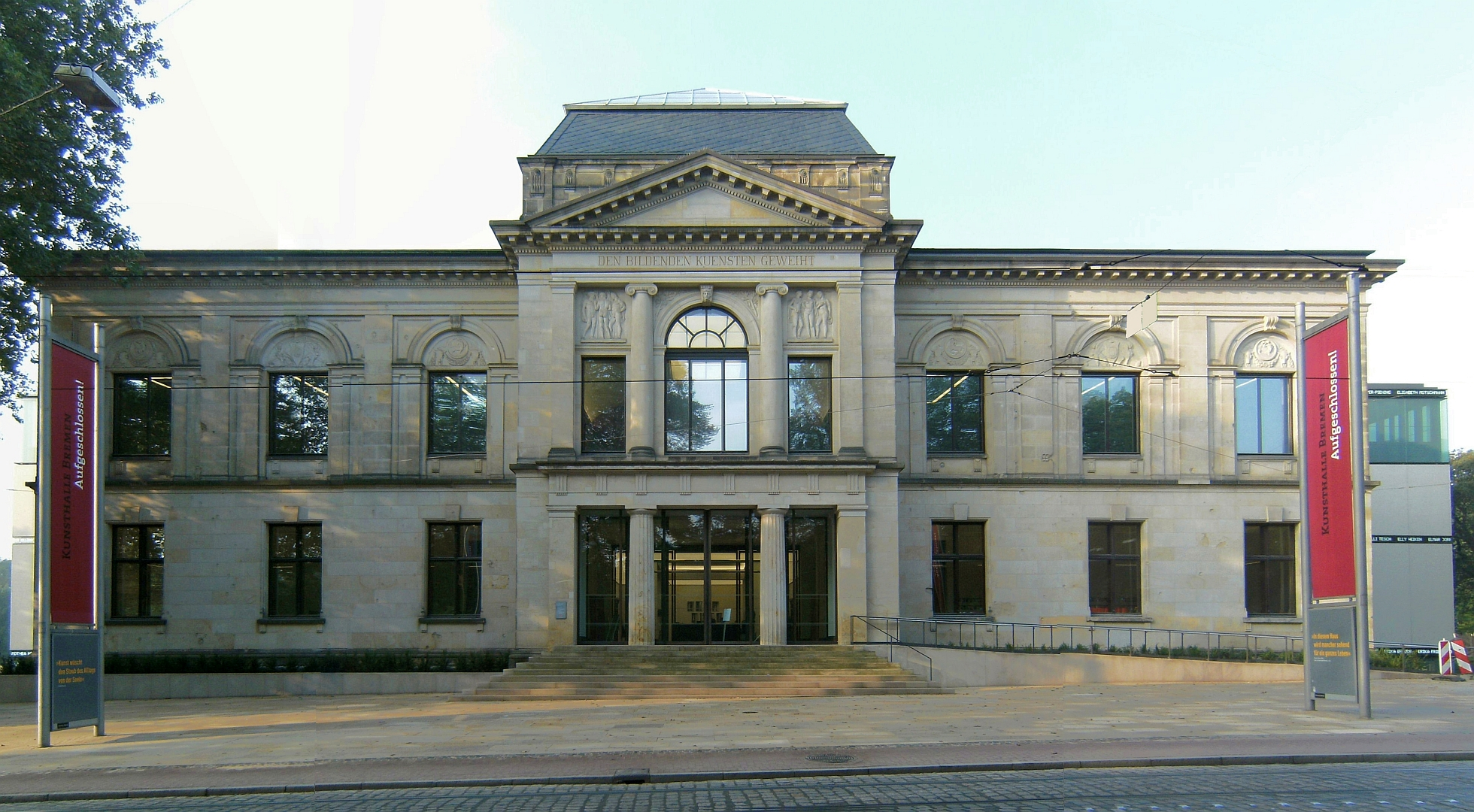
- The restored Kunsthalle Bremen in 2011
- Interactive fullscreen map
- Established: 1823
- Location: Am Wall 207; 28195 Bremen, Germany
- Coordinates: 53°04′22″N 8°48′49″E
- Type: Art museum, Historic site
- Website: www.kunsthalle-bremen.de

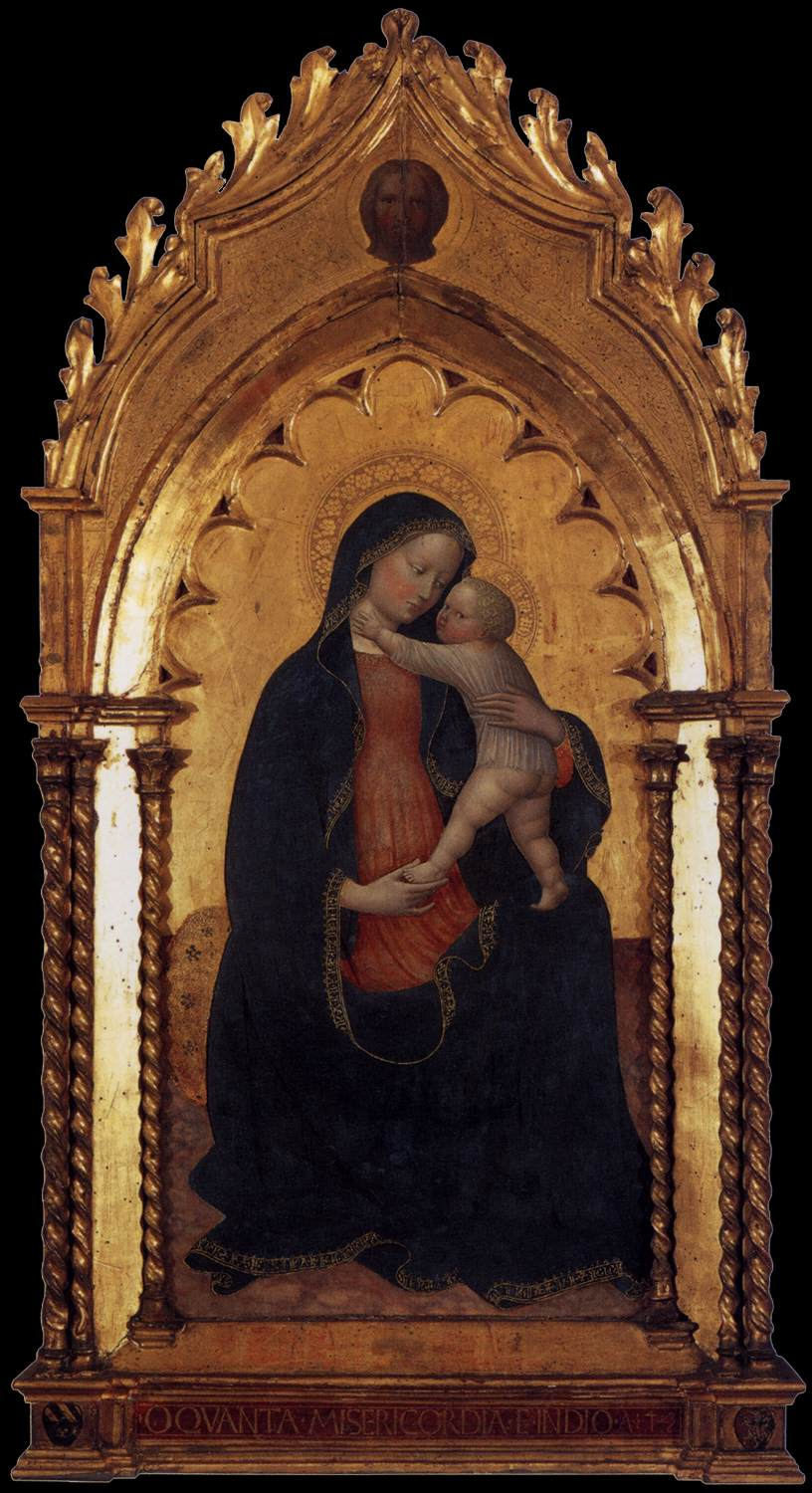
Madonna with Child (1423), Masolino da Panicale

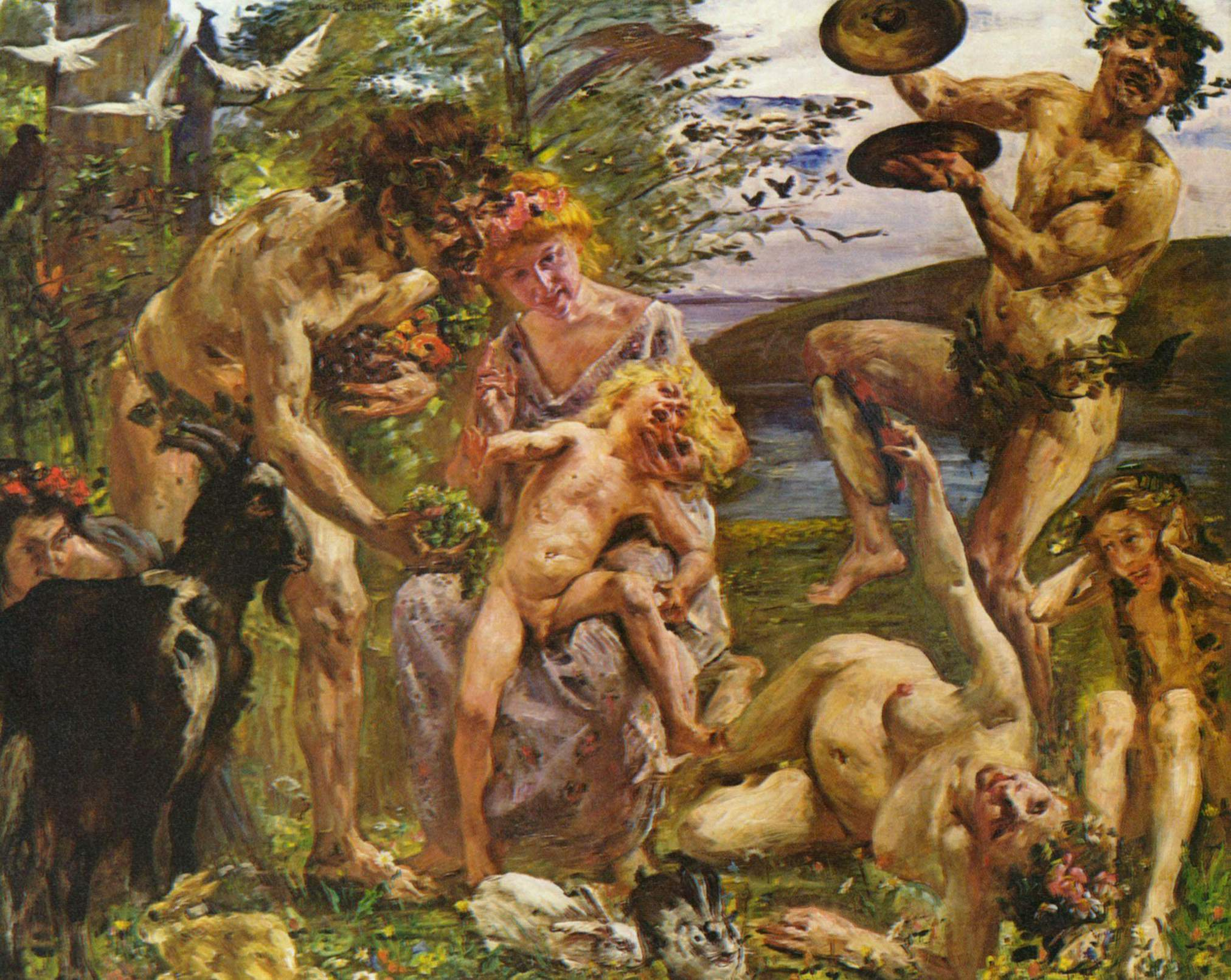
Die Jugend des Zeus (1905), Lovis Corinth

The Kunsthalle Bremen is an art museum in Bremen, Germany. It is located close to the Bremen Old Town on the "Culture Mile" (German: Kulturmeile). The Kunsthalle was built in 1849, enlarged in 1902 by architect Eduard Gildemeister, and expanded several more times, most notably in 2011. Since 1977, the building has been designated a Kulturdenkmal on Germany's buildings heritage list.

The museum houses a collection of European paintings from the 14th century to the present day, sculptures from the 16th to 21st century and a New Media collection. Among its highlights are French and German paintings from the 19th and 20th centuries, including important works by Claude Monet, Édouard Manet and Paul Cézanne, along with major paintings by Lovis Corinth, Max Liebermann, Max Beckmann and Paula Modersohn-Becker. The New Media section features works by John Cage, Otto Piene, Peter Campus, Olafur Eliasson, and Nam June Paik. The Department of Prints and Drawings has 220,000 sheets from the 15th to 20th century, one of largest collections of its kind in Europe.

The Kunsthalle Bremen is operated by the non-profit Bremen Art Society (German: Kunstverein Bremen), making it the only German museum with an extensive art collection from the 14th to 21st century which is still in private ownership.

== History ==
=== History of the Art Society ===
In 1823, a group of 34 businessmen interested in art founded an Art Society (German: Kunstverein) in Bremen with the aim of "spreading a sense of beauty and form." It is one of the oldest such societies in Germany. The first years of the association's activities were focused on private art exhibitions, with the acquisition of works backed financially from ticket proceeds and business donations. Ten years after its founding, the Society owned 13 paintings, 585 drawings and 3917 leaf prints. The majority of the paintings were Old Masters, including the famous Madonna of Masolino and a series of paintings of Dutch painters of the 17th century, such as Jan van Goyen and Pieter Wouwerman. After 1843, large public exhibitions were organized in association with similar associations in Hannover, Lübeck, Greifswald, Rostock and Stuttgart. By 1846 the society had grown to 575 members. The Kunstverein Bremen is still the exclusive owner of the Kunsthalle Bremen and today has over 8000 members. The society is funded from foundations, private donations, bequests, and grants from the city of Bremen.

=== History of the Kunsthalle ===
==== The building of 1849 ====
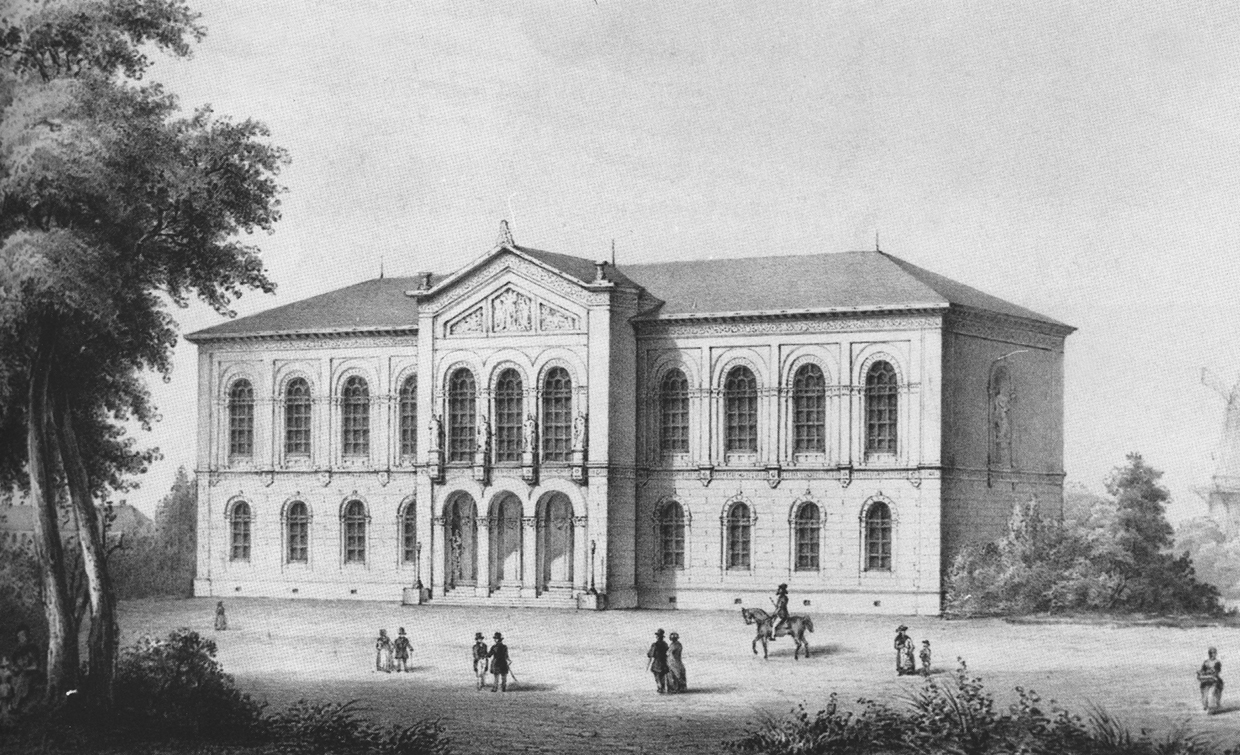
The Kunsthalle Bremen in 1849

Supported by numerous foundations and patrons, the Art Society put out a competitive bid for a new museum building. A then very young Lueder Rutenberg—himself a member of the Art Association—won against prominent competitors. The Society broke ground on the Kunsthalle on 1 July 1847, becoming the first Society in Germany with its own building. The construction project was located on a former rubbish dump in the vicinity of the old city ramparts and the building was finished in 1849. Rutenberg's design was of a dignified but understated two-story building with a three-axis central projection of round arches. While the collections were largely owned by the Kunstverein, the property itself was owned by the city. Four stone figures over the entrance are of Raphael, Michelangelo, Dürer, and Rubens, created by the sculptor Adolph Steinhäuser (1825–1858).

==== Expansion in 1902 ====
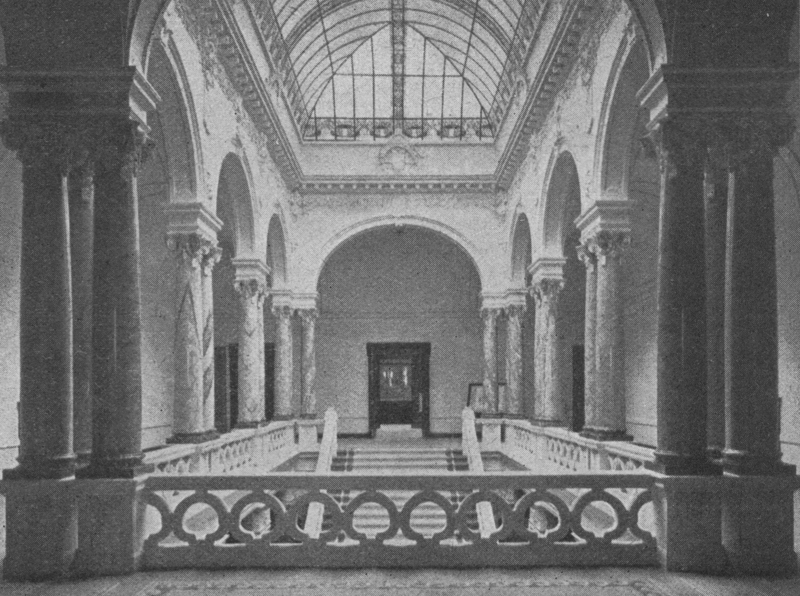
The Kunsthalle's new central hall in 1902, destroyed during World War II

After another competition among Bremen architects, a much-needed enlargement was commissioned in 1898. Albert Dunkel was selected to design the interiors, Eduard Gildemeister for the monumental sandstone facade, and decoration by renowned sculptors Georg Roemer and Georg Wrba. The foundation work was begun in 1899 and on 15 February 1902 the opening ceremony took place. The facade was under construction until 1904. The expansion was funded by foundations and businessmen in Bremen.

==== Consequences of World War II ====
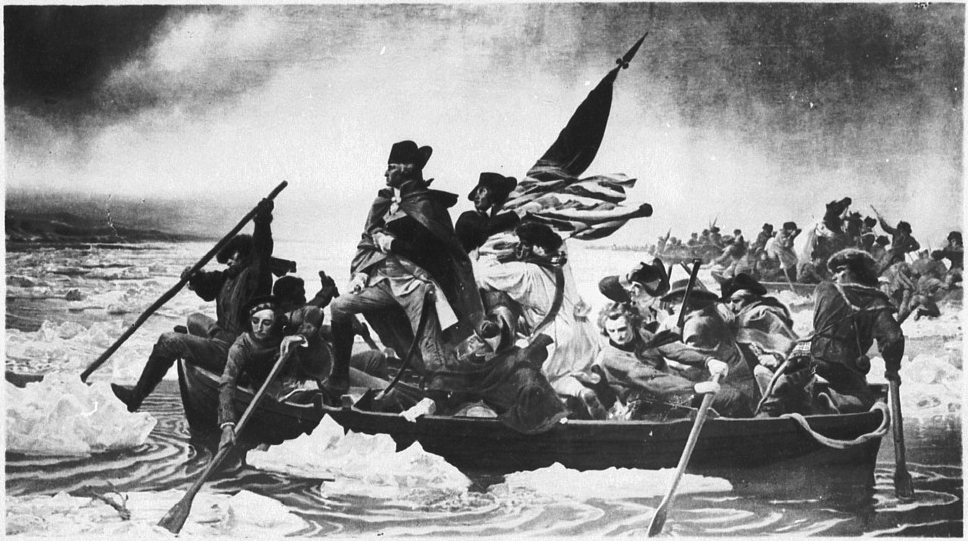
The original Washington Crossing the Delaware (1849–50) by Emanuel Leutze, which was destroyed in a British air raid on 5 September 1942

The art gallery was closed shortly after the outbreak of war and the collection was initially stored in the basement. On the night of 5 September 1942, a fire bomb dropped during an air raid by the British Royal Air Force destroyed the central staircase and six rooms upstairs. It also burned the painting Washington Crossing the Delaware by Emanuel Leutze, which because of its size could not be removed. Today a second version hangs in the Metropolitan Museum of Art in New York.

After this damage, large parts of the collection were moved to protected areas underneath the Bremer Landesbank and Norddeutschen Kreditbank. As the severity of Allied air raids on Bremen increased, Mayor Böhmcker finally decreed that the collection should be housed outside the city in safety. The removal of the artworks began in 1943 to four different places: the paintings, drawings and graphic sheets were divided between Karnzow Castle of Count Königsmarck near Kyritz, Neumühle Castle of Count von der Schulenburg in Salzwedel, and Schwöbber Castle near Hameln. The sculptures were taken to the princely crypt at Bückeburg Castle.

Karnzow Castle was located in the Margraviate of Brandenburg closer to Berlin and it held 50 paintings, 1715 drawings and about 3000 prints from the collection. The castle was taken in May 1945 by Soviet troops and on their return home it was plundered. The Soviets also left the hiding place open, with the result that works of art were within the reach of everyone. Berlin sculptor Kurt Reutti, head of a unit of the Berlin City Council, was able to find several items by extensive research and reclamation from the local black market. However, the losses of the Kunsthalle Bremen stand alongside those of the Prussian Cultural Heritage Foundation and the Dresden art collections as the largest and most devastating of any German museum from the war. In all over 1,500 works from the Kunsthalle remain missing today.

==== Reconstruction after 1945 ====
In the immediate postwar period, the conditions of the museum and the activities of the Art Society were extremely difficult. Between 1947 and 1948, soldiers of the US Army were billeted in the art gallery, Print Room and Board Room. Because of war damage the building was unusable for displaying art, although exhibitions were organized at other locations starting in 1946. In 1948, ten rooms upstairs were again opened to the public for the 125th anniversary of the Art Society. After further repairs, all rooms on the upper floor were usable again by the end of 1951. In 1961 an extensive restoration was carried out which repaired the heavy war damage. The staircase and the front entrance were modernized in the style of the time.

==== Expansion in 1982 ====
An extension to the building was completed in 1982 by architect Werner Düttmann and caused a scandal. Contrary to the plans which had been approved in sandstone red brick facade was built instead.

==== Renovations 1990–1999 ====
In 1990, the Art Society secured financing for the renovation of the workshops, storage areas and the main Print Room of the now structurally and functionally obsolete building. Between 1996 and 1998, more renovations of the Art Gallery continued under the chairman Georg Abegg and director Wulf Herzogenrath. These were urgent because the exhibition halls were in poor condition, the lighting did not meet the requirements and climate conditions did not meet international standards.

In 1995, the Art Society's board of trustees began a "Save the Art Gallery" capital campaign under the leadership of the merchant and deputy chairman Dieter Harald Berghöfer, which reached out to patrons. Within one year it had received 7 million marks, a third of the calculated construction costs (in a city with fewer than 600,000 inhabitants). The state of Bremen and the Federal Republic then provided the other two thirds. Due to unexpected difficulties with the building, construction costs rose to almost 25 million DM, and these additional costs were raised solely by donors who wanted to support the efforts of the Art Society and the board of trustees.

As a result of the renovation, golden oak parquet replaced the linoleum, while the 24 halls and intimate cabinets in which the permanent collection is grouped are bathed in color.

==== Extension 2011 ====
Between 2009 and 2011, the older constructions of 1961 and 1982 were demolished and two modernist, cubic wings with 5,560 square metres (59,800 sq ft) of gross floor area were added to the old main building according to the plans by architects Hufnagel, Putz and Rafaelian. The main building with 7,410 square metres (79,800 sq ft) of gross floor area was completely renovated and portions modernized. The project cost around €30 million. The families of Friedrich and Peter Lürßen of Lürssen shipyard fame and the Karin and Uwe Hollweg Foundation contributed a third, and the city of Bremen and the Federal Government each one-third of these costs. Additional costs of €3.5 million for among other things geothermal heating were covered by the art society. The new Art Gallery opened on 20 August 2011 and held its first major exhibition at the on 15 October 2011. [3]

== Collections ==
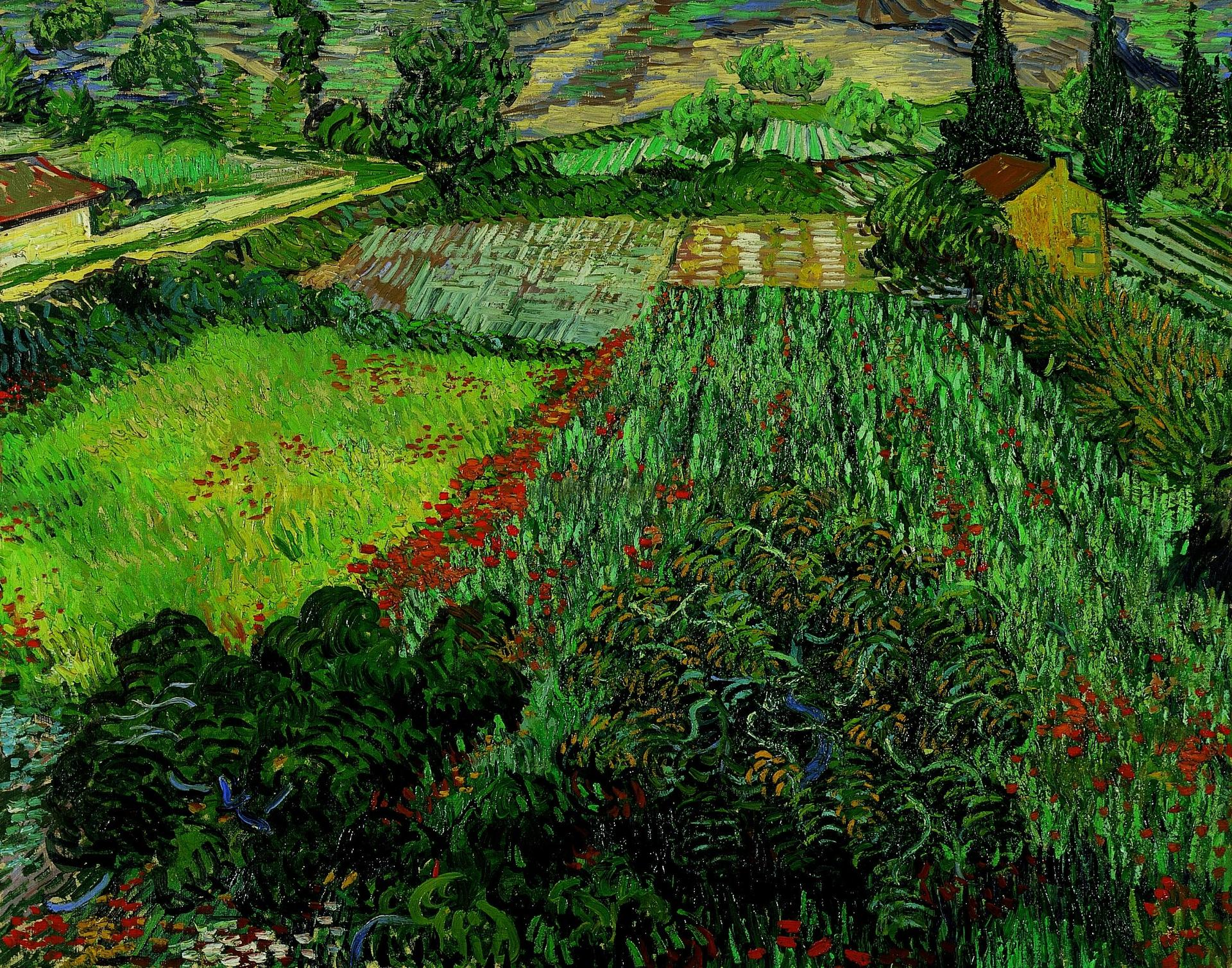
Field with Poppies (1889), Vincent van Gogh

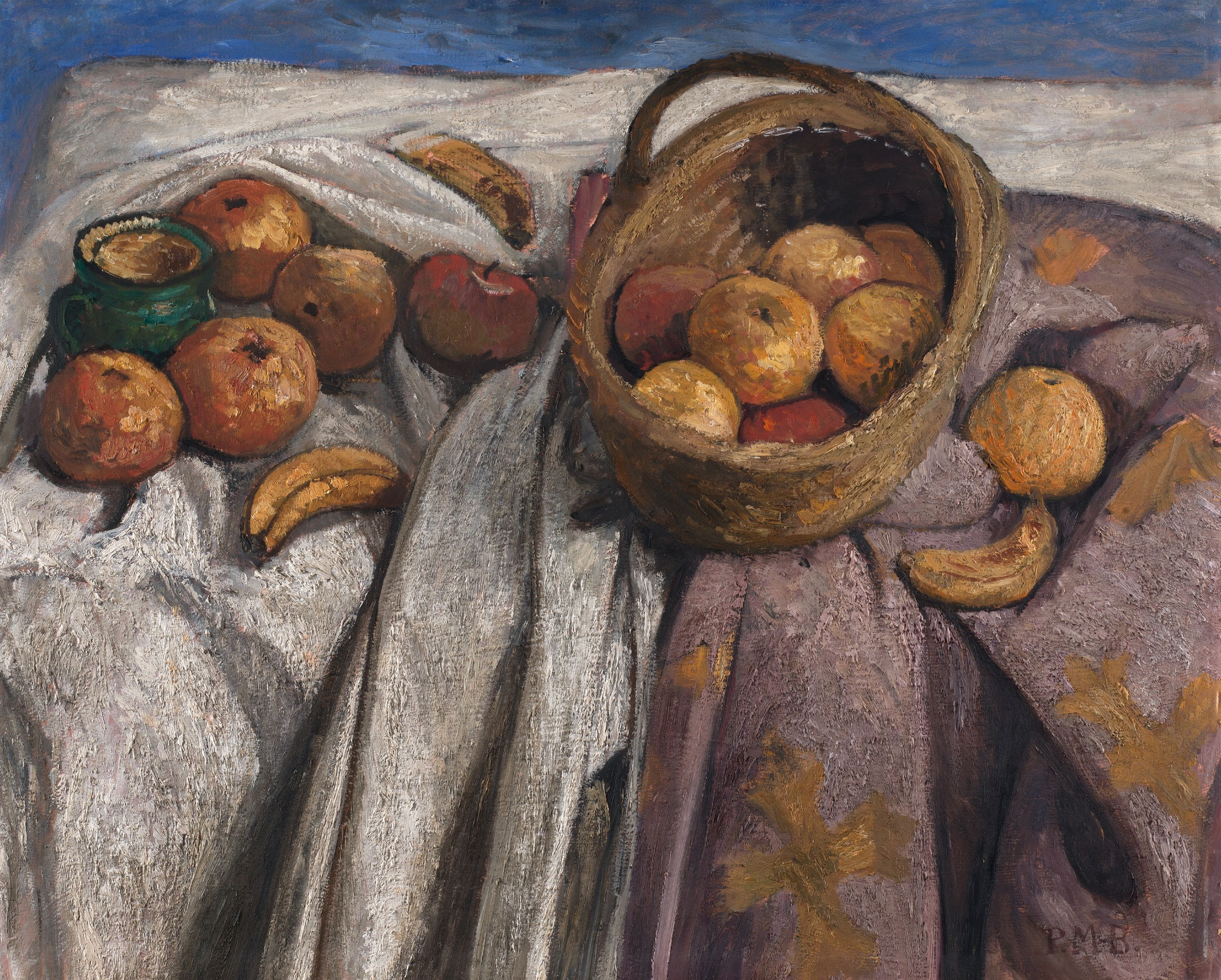
Still Life with Apples and Bananas (1905), Paula Modersohn-Becker

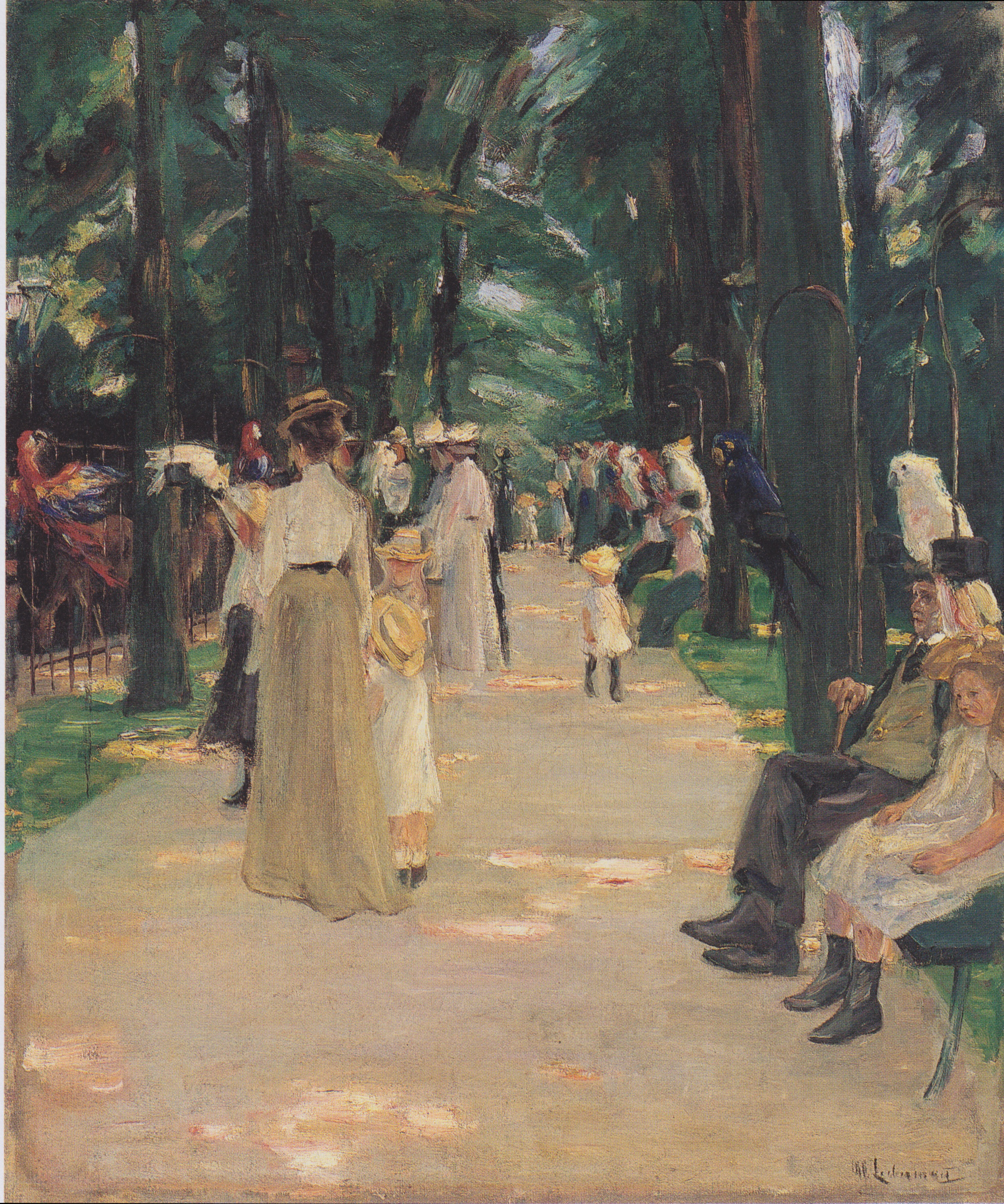
The Papageienallee (1902), Max Liebermann

=== Paintings ===
The museum's paintings span the 14th century to the present day and are primarily West European. Among the collection's highlights are French and German works from the 19th and 20th centuries, including important pieces by Paul Cézanne, Édouard Manet, Claude Monet, Henri de Toulouse-Lautrec and Vincent van Gogh. It holds major paintings by Max Beckmann, Lovis Corinth, Max Liebermann, and Paula Modersohn-Becker. The museum also houses early modernist works by artists from the nearby art colony of Worpswede. Other represented artists include:

- Andreas Achenbach
- Albrecht Altdorfer
- Arnold Boecklin
- Carl Blechen
- Merry-Joseph Blondel
- Willy von Beckerath
- Julius Schnorr von Carolsfeld
- Gustave Courbet
- Camille Corot
- Lucas Cranach the Elder
- Eugène Delacroix
- Albrecht Dürer
- Adam Elsheimer
- Heinrich Jakob Fried
- Joseph von Führich
- Otto Gildemeister
- Eva Gonzalès
- Franz Krüger
- Johann Liss
- August Macke
- Franz Marc
- Hans von Marées
- Anton Raphael Mengs
- Edvard Munch
- Friedrich Paul Nerly
- Jules Pascin
- Camille Pissarro
- Odilon Redon
- Théo van Rysselberghe
- Otto Scholderer
- Carl Schuch
- Alfred Sisley
- Max Slevogt
- Sébastien Stoskopff
- Hans Thoma
- Carl Wagner

=== Prints and drawings ===
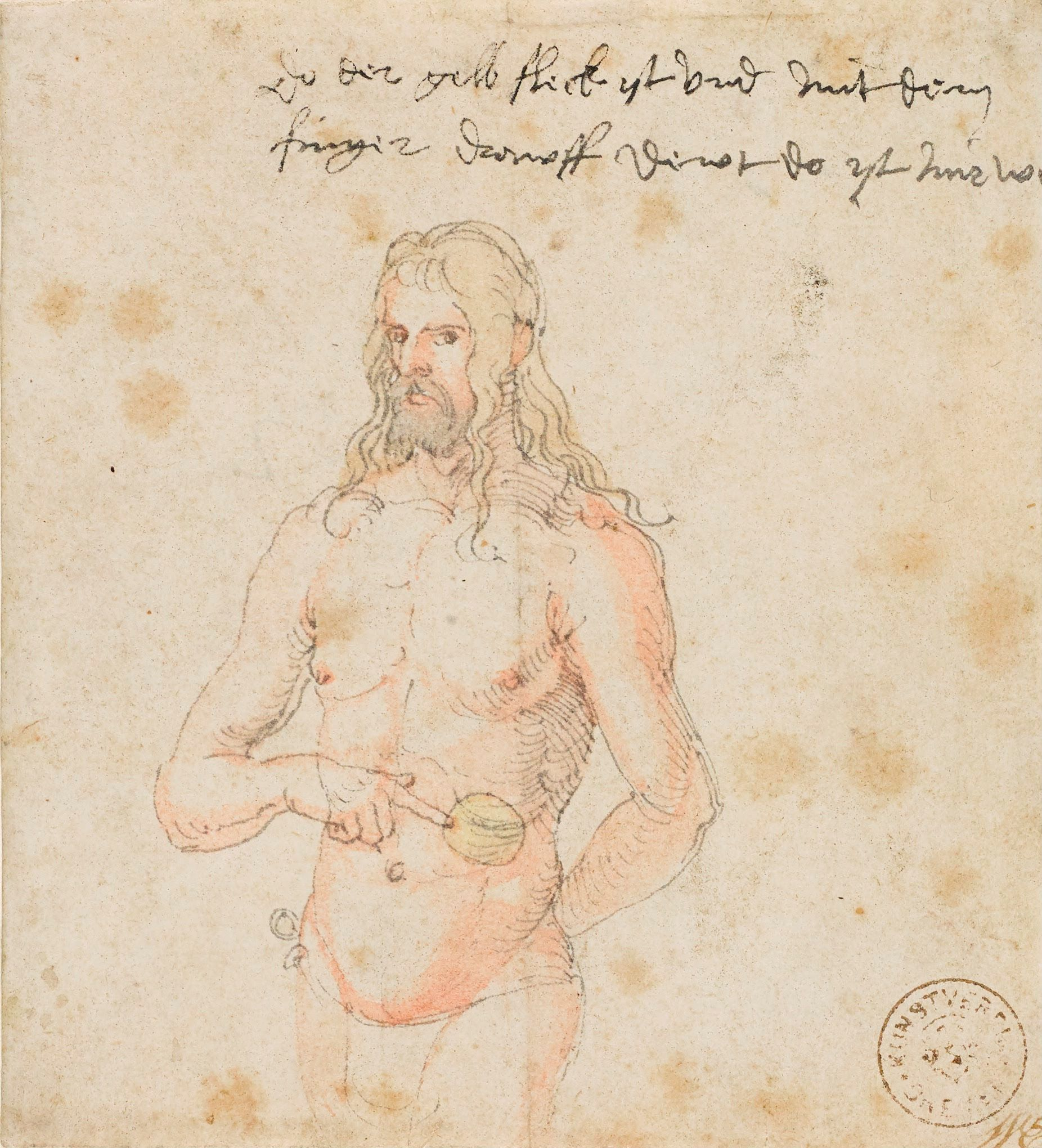
Self Portrait (1521), Albrecht Dürer

The Department of Prints and Drawings has 220,000 sheets from the 15th to 20th century, including hand drawings, aquarelles, copperplate prints, and printed graphs. It is one of largest and most important collections of its kind in Europe. Artists include:

- Edgar Degas
- Albrecht Dürer
- Berthe Morisot

=== New Media ===
The New Media section features works by John Cage, Otto Piene, Peter Campus, Olafur Eliasson, Nam June Paik and others. The Kunstverein promotes current art trends by awarding the Böttcherstrasse Art Prize and organizing exhibitions of the Förderkreis für Gegenwartskunst (association for the support of contemporary art).

=== Baldin Collection ===
In 1945 Soviet Army officer Viktor Baldin discovered the stored works from the Kunsthalle in the basement of Karnzow Castle. In order to protect them from complete destruction, he grabbed drawings by Rembrandt, Titian, Rubens, Goya, Van Gogh and Édouard Manet and brought them to the Soviet Union in a suitcase. In 1963 Baldin became Director of the Moscow Architecture Museum. In the autumn of 1989 he visited the Bremen Kunsthalle and reported to the chairman of the Art Society that he had the time to get two paintings and 362 drawings out of Castle Karnzow and had handed them over to the Schtschusev State Research and Science Museum for safekeeping. In the following years he tried repeatedly to return the artwork to the Bremen Art Society by appealing to the highest authorities of the USSR, but without success. The whole issue of "looted art" from Germany was still taboo at that time. In 1995, a show named after him was held in the Hermitage collection in St. Petersburg. In February 2003, the then Russian Minister of Culture, after a formal request of the Kunstverein in 2000, provided a written commitment that the Baldin Collection should be returned to Bremen. Although the collection is not covered by the Plundered Art Laws, the Russian State Duma has so far refused to return it. In 2005 Russia's Culture Minister Alexander Sokolov said that returning the collection to Germany was "out of the question."

== Claims for restitution linked to the Holocaust ==
In 2009 Wilhelm Leibl's 'Bauernmädchen (Peasant Girl)' which was on loan to the Kunsthalle Bremen was restituted to the heirs of Alexander Lewin, a Jewish collector who was persecuted and plundered by Nazis.

In 2013, the Kunsthalle Bremen reached an agreement with the Berolzheimer heirs concerning "Rückenfigur einer Frau im faltigen Gewand“ von Giacomo Cavedone (1577–1660) which the museum had acquired in 1941 after the Jewish owners had been forced to auction it in 1937. In 2014 the Kunsthalle restitution the drawing “Madonna and Child” by Francesco Trevisani which had been taken from the Jewish collector Michael Berolzheimer. In 2016 the Kunsthalle restituted then repurchased a drawing 'Felsige Waldlandschaft mit weitem Ausblick' by Isaak Majo looted from Arthur Feldmann, a Jewish collector murdered in the Holocaust. The Kunsthalle rejected a claim from the heirs of the artist George Grosz stating that he had lost the artwork due to debt and not Nazi persecution. There have been many more claims and it is not known how many Nazi looted artworks remain in the museum; research is ongoing, focusing on Bremen collectors and art dealers Arnold Blome, Heinrich Glosemeier and Hugo Oelze.

== See also ==
- List of art museums
- List of museums in Germany
- Butcher Store in Schäftlarn on the Isar
