= Heinrich Jakob Fried =

German painter (1802–1870)

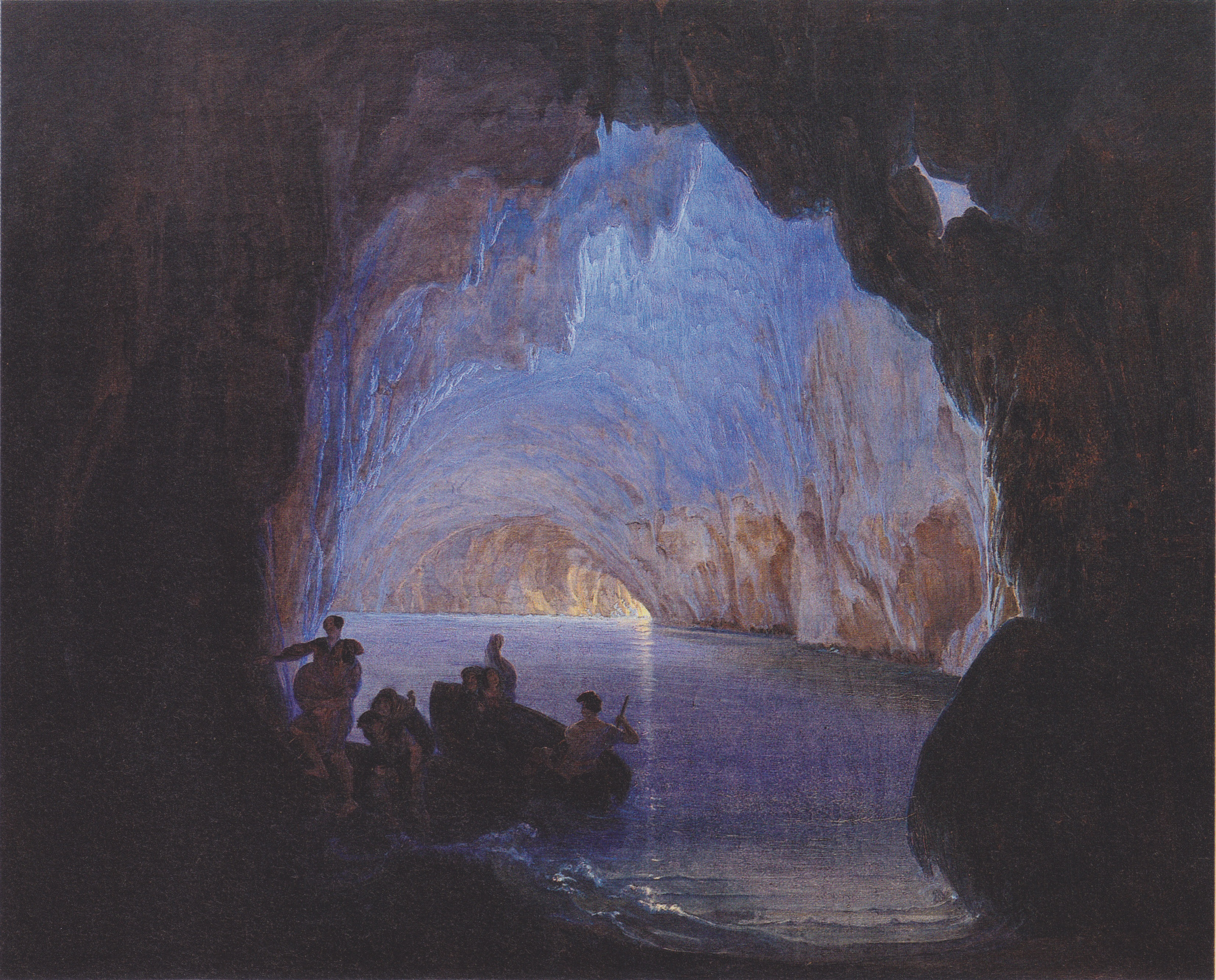
The Blue Grotto at Capri, an 1835 painting now in the Kunsthalle Bremen

Heinrich Jakob Fried (11 March 1802, Queichheim - 2 November 1870, Munich) was a German painter.

== Life and work ==
He studied at Stuttgart and Augsburg, and from 1822 under Johann Peter von Langer and Peter von Cornelius at the Academy of Fine Arts, Munich. In 1834 he went to Rome, and afterwards to Naples, and from thence returned to his native country in 1837. Being patronized by Prince Karl Philipp von Wrede, he settled at Munich in 1842, and became conservator of the Artistic Society in 1845.

Fried was a great lover of legends, often taking these and similar sources for the subjects of his best pictures. He also executed a great number of landscapes, as well as genre and historical pieces and portraits, the best of which are:

- A Hunting Party before the Castle of Trifels.
- The Blue Grotto at Capri. (formerly in the Alte Pinakothek, now in the Kunsthalle Bremen)
- A View of Hohenschwangau.
- The Wounded Knight.
- Italian Flute-Players.
- The Cloister of San Scolastica.
- Views of the Palaces of Italy.

== See also ==
- List of German painters
