= Jill Lloyd =

British writer and curator (born 1965)

- Born: 18 February 1955 (age 71); London, England
- Known for: German and Austrian art history

Academic background
- Education: Courtauld Institute of Art
- Website: jill-lloyd.com

Jill Lloyd is a writer and curator specializing in twentieth-century art, with particular expertise for German and Austrian art. She has organised many critically acclaimed exhibitions for leading museums and has published widely, including her book German Expressionism, Primitivism and Modernity (Yale University Press), which was awarded the first National Art Book Prize.

She is a member of the board of trustees for the Neue Galerie New York, where she has curated several important exhibitions including Van Gogh and Expressionism, Vasily Kandinsky: From Blaue Reiter to Bauhaus, Ferdinand Hodler, View to Infinity, Vienna 1900, Munch and Expressionism, and Richard Gerstl.

== Early life ==
After completing her studies at the Courtauld Institute of Art with a PhD on German Expressionism, Lloyd began her career as a lecturer in twentieth-century Art at University College, London University. On moving to Paris in 1989 she worked as Editor of Art International Magazine.

== Art ==
Since 1995 Lloyd has had a successful career as an independent art historian, curating a number of prestigious exhibitions for leading international museums including Tate, Royal Academy London, National Gallery of Art Washington, Neuenationalgalerie Berlin, Van Gogh Museum and the Beyeler Foundation. Alongside her expertise on Expressionism, she is known for her writings on contemporary artists such as Georg Baselitz and Gerhard Richter.

In 2001 Jill Lloyd was awarded the Order of Merit by the German government for promoting cultural relations between Germany and the United Kingdom and for bringing German art of the 20th century to a wider audience.

== Personal life ==
Married to the writer Michael Peppiatt, Lloyd lives between Paris and London. Her daughter Clio Peppiatt is British fashion designer and her son Alex Peppiatt works in the music industry.

== Exhibitions ==
- Lovis Corinth retrospective, Haus der Kunst, Munich, Nationalgalerie Berlin, Saint Louis Art Museum, Tate Gallery, London (1997)
- School of London, from Francis Bacon to Tony Bevan, Musée Maillol, Paris, Auditorio de Galicia, Santiago de Compostela and Kunsthaus, Vienna (1998)
- La Vérité nue (Gerstl, Schiele, Kokoschka, Boeckl), Musée Maillol, Paris (2001)
- Christian Schad and the Neue Sachlichkeit, Musée Maillol, Paris and Neue Galerie New York (2002)
- Ernst Ludwig Kirchner in Dresden and Berlin, National Gallery of Art, Washington DC and Royal Academy of Art, London (2003)
- German Expressionist Prints, from Kirchner to Beckmann, Van Gogh Museum, Amsterdam (2004)
- Miodrag Duric: ‘DADO, The Zorzi Elegies, Venice Biennale, 53rd International Exhibition, Palazzo Zorzi, Venice (2009)
- Vienna 1900, Style and Identity, Neue Galerie New York (2011)
- Ferdinand Hodler, View to Infinity, Neue Galerie New York and Fondation Beyeler, Riehen bei Basle (2012)
- Vasily Kandinsky, From Blaue Reiter to the Bauhaus, 1910–25, Neue Galerie New York (2013)
- Munch and Expressionism, Neue Galerie New York (2016)
- Richard Gerstl, Neue Galerie New York (2017)

== Publications ==
=== Books ===
- German Expressionism, Primitivism and Modernity, Yale University Press, London and New Haven (Awarded the National Art Book Prize in 1992) (1991)
- Per Kirkeby, Tate Gallery, London (1998)
- Max Beckmann, L’exil d’Amsterdam 1937–1947, Edition L’Échoppe, Paris (2004)
- Van Gogh and Expressionism, edited by Jill Lloyd, Neue Galerie Publications, New York (2007)
- Vincent Van Gogh and Expressionism, Hatje Cantz, Ostfildern and Gallimard, Paris (2007)
- The Undiscovered Expressionist: A Life of Marie-Louise von Motesiczky, Yale University Press, London and New Haven (2007)
- Max Beckmann: Self-Portrait with Horn, Neue Galerie Publications, New York (2008)
- Georg Baselitz, Collected Writings and Interviews, edited by Detlev Gretenkort with Introduction by Jill Lloyd (2010)
- Egon Schiele. Women. Richard Nagy Ltd, London (2011)
- Birth of the Modern: Style and Identity in Vienna 1900, edited by Jill Lloyd and Christian Witt-Doerring (2011)
- Ferdinand Hodler, edited by Jill Lloyd and Ulf Kuester, Neue Galerie Publications (2012)
- Vasily Kandinsky, edited by Jill Lloyd, Neue Galerie Publications (2013)
- Munch and Expressionism, edited by Jill Lloyd and Reinhold Heller, Neue Galerie Publications (2016)
- Bill Jacklin: Graphics, edited by Jill Lloyd and Nancy Campbell, Royal Academy of Arts (2016)
- Richard Gerstl: Retrospektive, edited by Jill Lloyd, Ingrid Pfeiffer and Raymond Coffer, Neue Galerie Publications (2017)

=== Exhibition catalogues and essays ===
- ‘Primitivism and Modernity – An Expressionist Dilemma,’ German Art in the 20th Century, Royal Academy of Art, London (1985)
- ‘Franz Xaver Messerschmidt, Character Heads/Arnulf Rainer, Overdrawings,’ ICA, London (1987)
- ‘Alfred Flechtheim: ein Sammler außereuropäischer Kunst,’ Alfred Flechtheim, Kunstmuseum Düsseldorf (1987)
- ‘Gerhard Richter, The London Paintings,’ Anthony d’Offay Gallery, London (1988)
- ‘Emil Nolde’s Ethnographic Still Lifes: Primitivism Tradition and Modernity’ in The Myth of Primitivism, edited by Susan Hiller, Methuen Press (1989)
- ‘The Painted City as Nature and Artifice (Ernst Ludwig Kirchner)’ in The Divided Heritage, Cambridge University Press (1989)
- ‘Das Verlorene Paradies,’ Emil Nolde, Museo d’Arte Moderna, Lugano (1994)
- ‘Lovis Corinth: Intimations of Mortality,’ Lovis Corinth, Tate Gallery and Saint Louis Art Museum. (1996)
- ‘Tradition et transformation dans la peinture britannique contemporaine,’ L’École de Londres, Musée Maillol, Paris (1998)
- Catalogue Entries on Erich Heckel and Max Pechstein for New Worlds: German and Austrian Art, 1890–1940, Neue Galerie New York (2001)
- ‘Ernst Ludwig Kirchner: Spiegel und Spiegelbilder’, Ernst Ludwig Kirchner, Neuerwerbungen seit 1998, Brücke -Museum, Berlin (2001)
- ‘Ernst Ludwig Kirchner,’ Deutsche Expressionismus, Art Focus Galerie Zürich (2001)
- ‘Austrian Expressionism,’ La Vérité nue, Musée Maillol, Paris (2001)
- ‘Nolde als Kritiker des deutschen Imperialismus’ and ‘Zur Rezeption außereuropäischer Kunst vor 1914,’ Emil Nolde in der Südsee, Brücke Museum, Berlin, Brücke-Archiv 20/2002 (2002)
- ‘Kirchner’s Metaphysical Studio Paintings,’ National Gallery Washington and Royal Academy of Art, London (2003)
- ‘Christian Schad: Reality and Illusion,’ Christian Schad and the Neue Sachlichkeit, Neue Galeie New York (2003)
- ‘Marie-Louise von Motesiczky – Eine Malerien der Erinnerung,’ Die Lieben, 150 Jahre Geschichte einer Wiener Familie, Jewish Museum Vienna (2005)
- ‘Beckmann: Exile in Amsterdam 1937-47,’ Tate Modern, London (2005)
- ‘Die Brücke – Streben nach Internationalität,’ Brücke-Museum Berlin, Malerei und Plastik, Kommentiertes Verzeichnis der Bestände (2006)
- ‘Heribert Ottersbach, Portraits and Exteriors,’ Ben Brown Gallery, London (2007)
- ‘The Vienna Years: Family Background and First Paintings,’ Marie-Louise von Motesiczky, Tate Liverpool, Museum Giersch, Frankfurt am Main, Wien Museum Vienna, Southampton Art Gallery (2007)
- ‘International Trends in Austrian Art,’ Herbert Boeckl Retrospective, Belvedere Gallery, Vienna (2009)
- ‘Brücke; National Identity and International Style,’ Brücke, The Birth of Expressionism in Dresden and Berlin, 1905–13, Neue Galerie New York (2009)
- ‘German Expressionism: apocalypse, war and revolution,’ The Mad Square, Modernity in German Art 1910–1937, Art Gallery New South Wales (2011)
- ‘Marc und Macke – Erste Blicke nach Frankreich,’ Im Farbenrausch, Munch, Matisee und die Expressionisten, Museum Folkwang (2013)
- ‘Gerhard Richter: Photo-Realist and Abstract Painting‘, Polke/Richter Richter/Polke, Christie's International, London (2014)
- ‘Jawlensky’s Late Work: Painting in Series,’ Alexei Jawlensky, Neue Galerie Publications (2017)
- ‘Ernst Ludwig Kirchner’s Skizzenalbum,’ Bonhams London (2017)
