= Ludwigshafen =

Ludwigshafen am Rhein Ludwichshafe (Palatine German)
- City
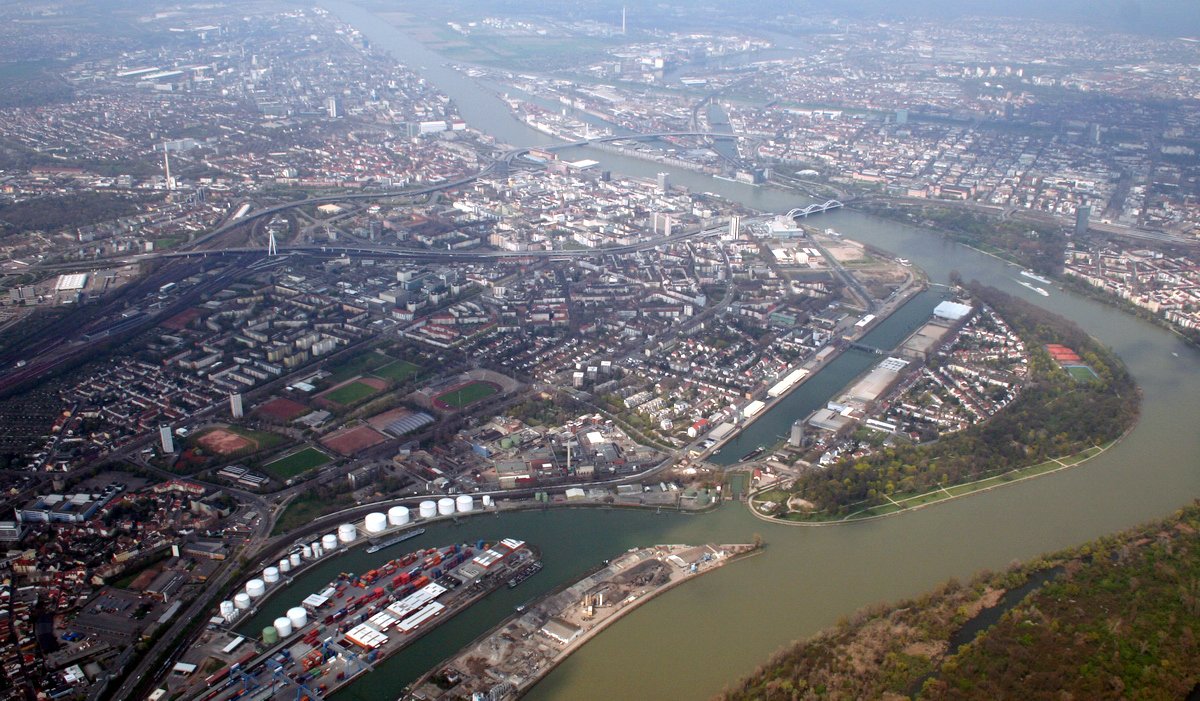
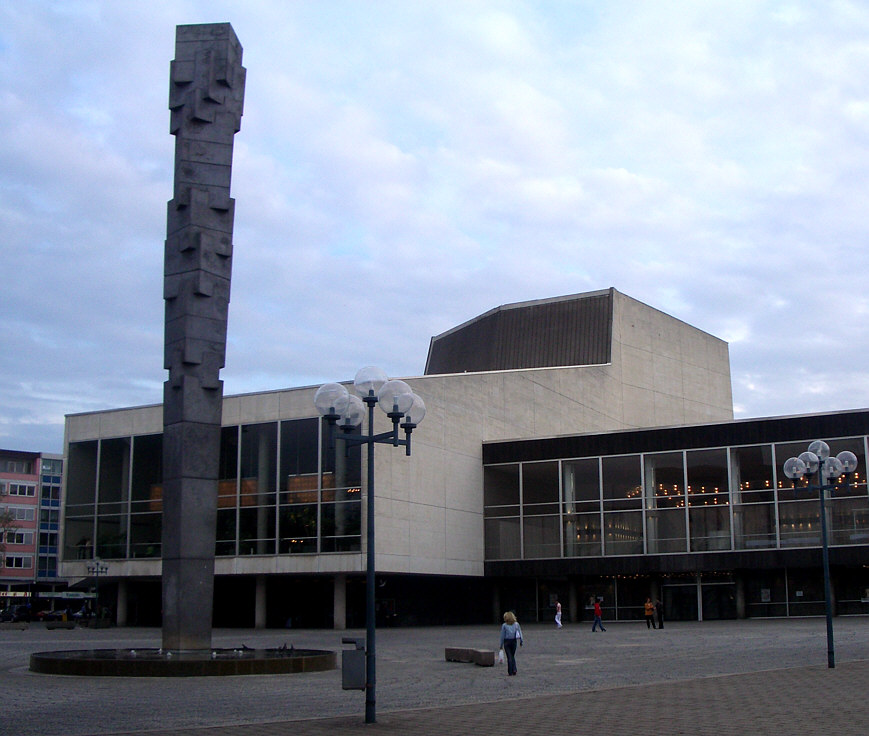
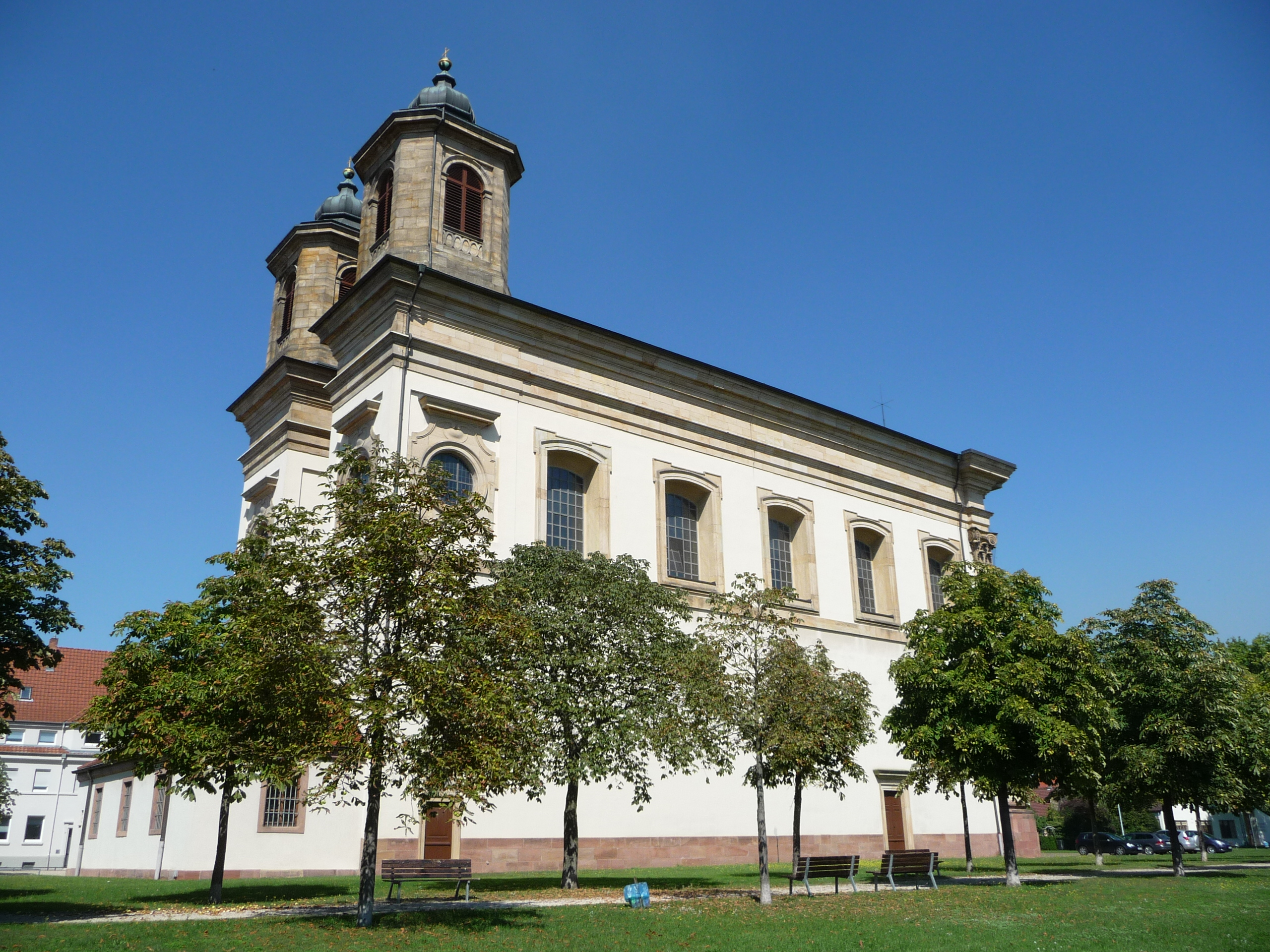
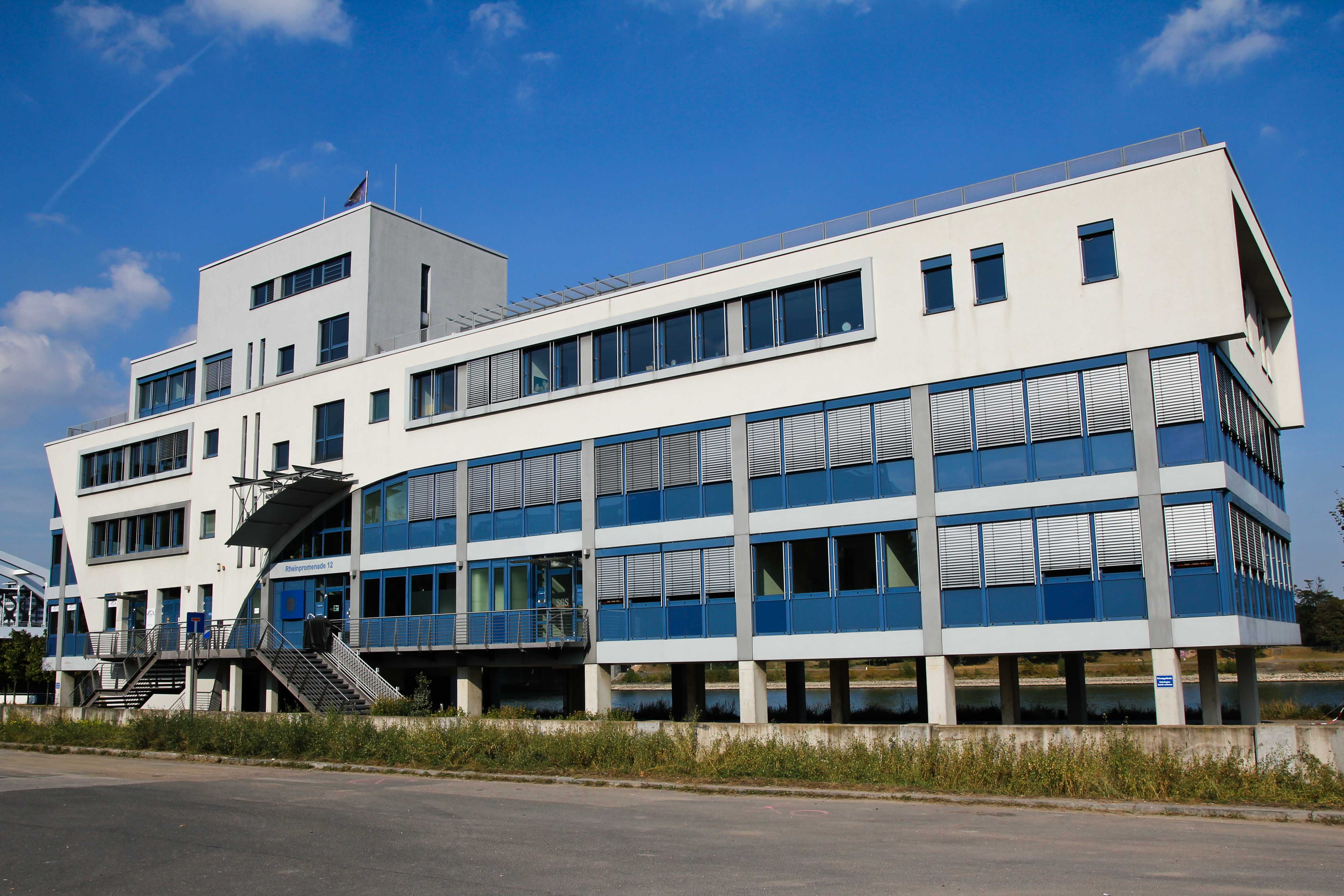
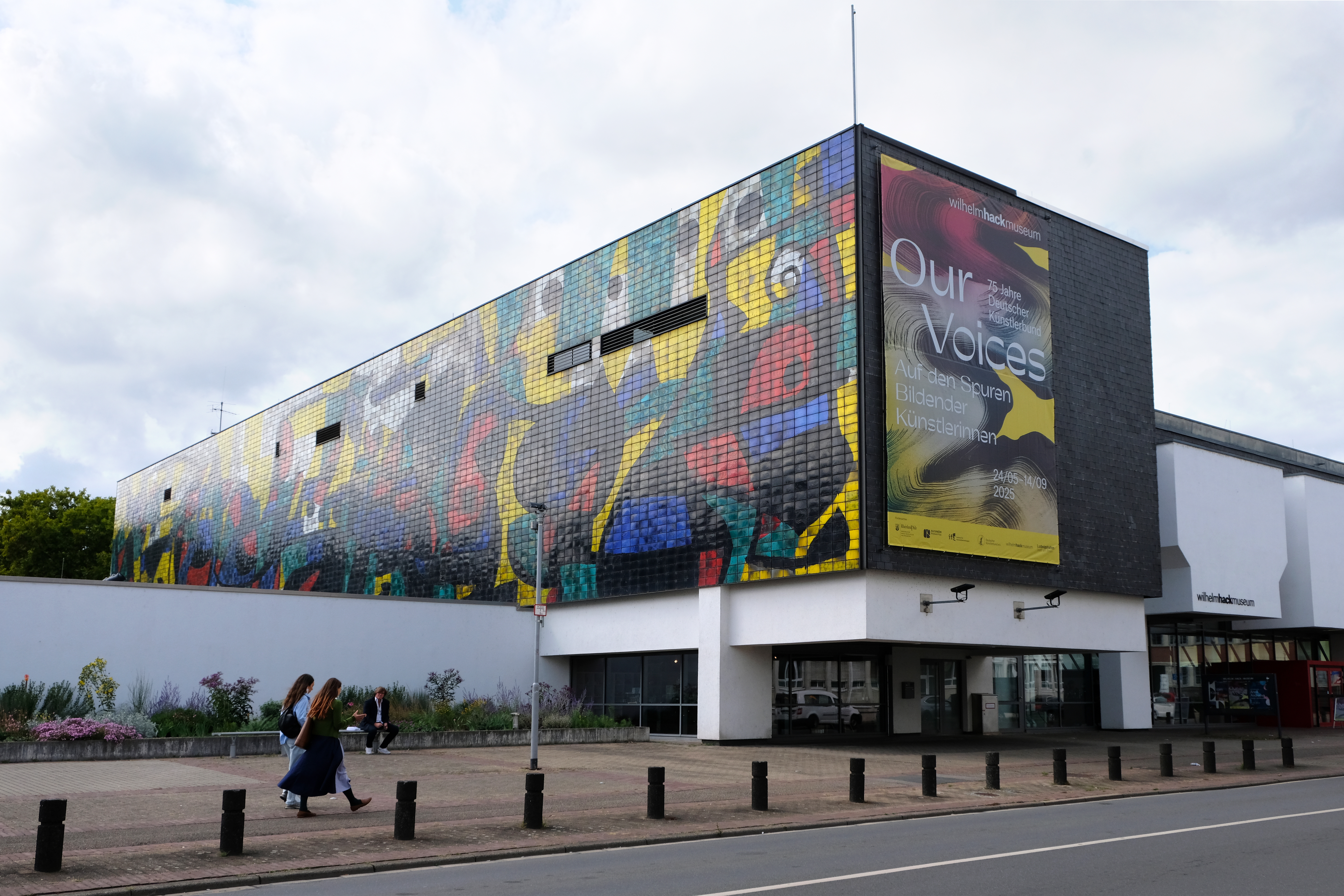
- View over Ludwigshafen Pfalzbau Church of the Assumption East Asian Institute Wilhelm Hack Museum

- Flag Coat of arms
- Interactive map of Ludwigshafen am Rhein
- Location within Germany Location within Rhineland-Palatinate
- Coordinates: 49°28′52″N 8°26′07″E
- Country: Germany
- State: Rhineland-Palatinate
- District: Urban district
- Subdivisions: 10 districts

Government
  - Mayor (2017—25): Klaus Blettner (CDU) (CDU)

Area
  - Total: 77.43 km^{2} (29.90 sq mi)
- Elevation: 96 m (315 ft)

Population (2025-12-31)
  - Total: 177,355
  - Density: 2,291/km^{2} (5,932/sq mi)
- Time zone: UTC+01:00 (CET)
  - Summer (DST): UTC+02:00 (CEST)
- Postal codes: 67059 - 67071
- Dialling codes: 0621, 06237
- Vehicle registration: LU
- Website: ludwigshafen.de

Ludwigshafen, officially Ludwigshafen am Rhein (German: [ˈluːtvɪçsˌhaːfn̩ ʔam ˈʁaɪn]; meaning "Ludwig's Port upon the Rhine"; Palatine German: Ludwichshafe), is a city in the German state of Rhineland-Palatinate, on the river Rhine (Upper Rhine), opposite Mannheim. With Mannheim, Heidelberg, and the surrounding region, it forms the Rhine-Neckar Metropolitan Region.

Known primarily as an industrial city, Ludwigshafen is home to BASF, the world's largest chemical producer, and other companies. Among its cultural facilities are the Staatsphilharmonie Rheinland-Pfalz.

It is the birthplace and death place of the former Chancellor of Germany, Helmut Kohl.

In 2012, Ludwigshafen was classified as a global city with "Sufficiency" status by the Globalization and World Cities Research Network (GaWC).

== History ==
=== Early history ===
In antiquity, Celtic and Germanic tribes settled in the Rhine Neckar region. During the 1st century B.C. the Romans conquered the region, and a Roman auxiliary fort was constructed near the present suburb of Rheingönheim.

The Middle Ages saw the foundation of some of Ludwigshafen's future suburbs, including Oggersheim, Maudach, Oppau, and Mundenheim. Most of the area, however, remained swampland, with its development hindered by seasonal flooding of the Rhine.

=== The Rheinschanze ===
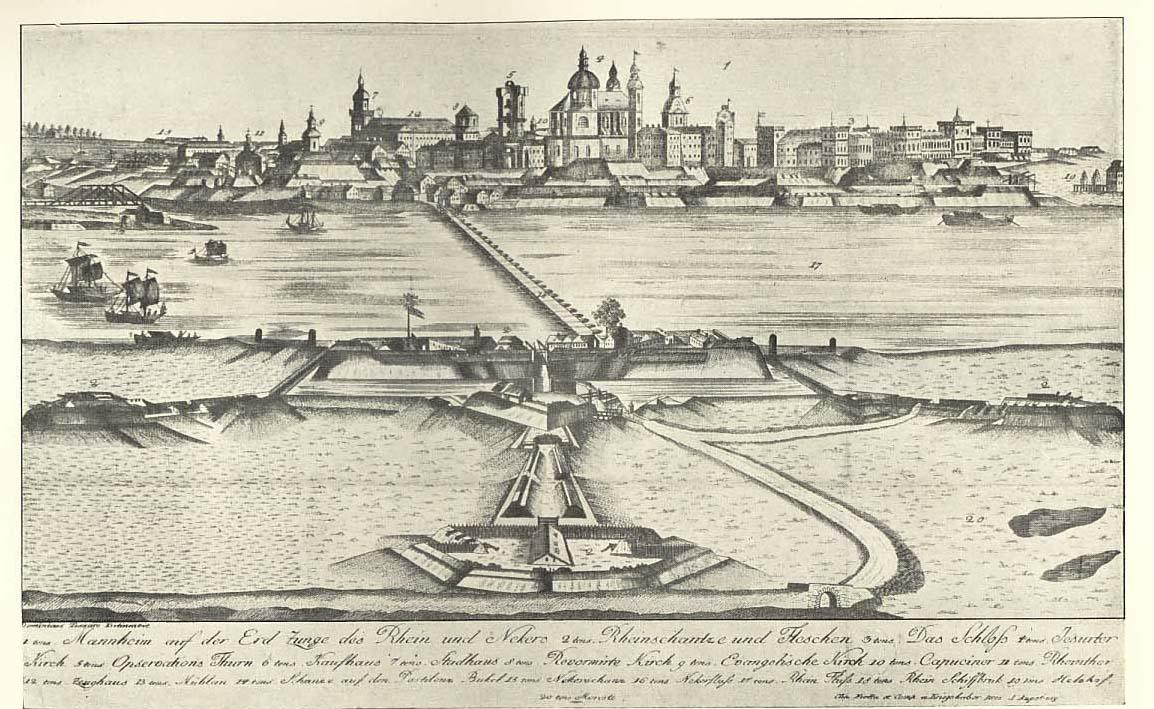
Rheinschanze c. 1750

The Rhine Neckar region was part of the territory of the Prince-elector of the Kurpfalz, or Electorate of the Palatinate, one of the larger states within the Holy Roman Empire. The foundation of the new capital of the Kurpfalz, Mannheim, was a decisive influence on the development of the area as a whole. Parallel to the foundation of Mannheim in 1606, a fortress (die Rheinschanze) was built by Frederick IV, Elector Palatine on the other side of the Rhine to protect the City of Mannheim, thus forming the nucleus of the City of Ludwigshafen itself.

In the 17th century, the region was devastated and depopulated during the Thirty Years' War, and also in King Louis XIV of France's wars of conquest in the later part of the century.

It was only in the 18th century that the settlements around the Rheinschanze began to prosper, profiting from the proximity of the capital, Mannheim. Oggersheim, in particular, gained some importance after the construction of both a small palace serving as a secondary residence for the Elector and the famous pilgrimage church, Wallfahrtskirche. For some weeks in 1782, the great German writer and playwright Friedrich Schiller lived in Oggersheim while fleeing his native Württemberg.

At the end of the 18th century, war returned to the Ludwigshafen area with the armies of the French Revolution. The palace at Oggersheim was burned down, Mannheim was besieged several times, and the area west of the Rhine was annexed by France from 1798 to 1813. The Electorate of the Palatinate was split up. After the French were expelled following the Wars of Liberation (1813–1815), the eastern bank of the Rhine with Mannheim and Heidelberg was given to Baden, while the western bank (including the Ludwigshafen area) was granted to the Kingdom of Bavaria. The Rhine had become a frontier and the Rheinschanze, cut off politically from Mannheim, lost its function as the neighbouring city's military bulwark.

=== Foundation ===
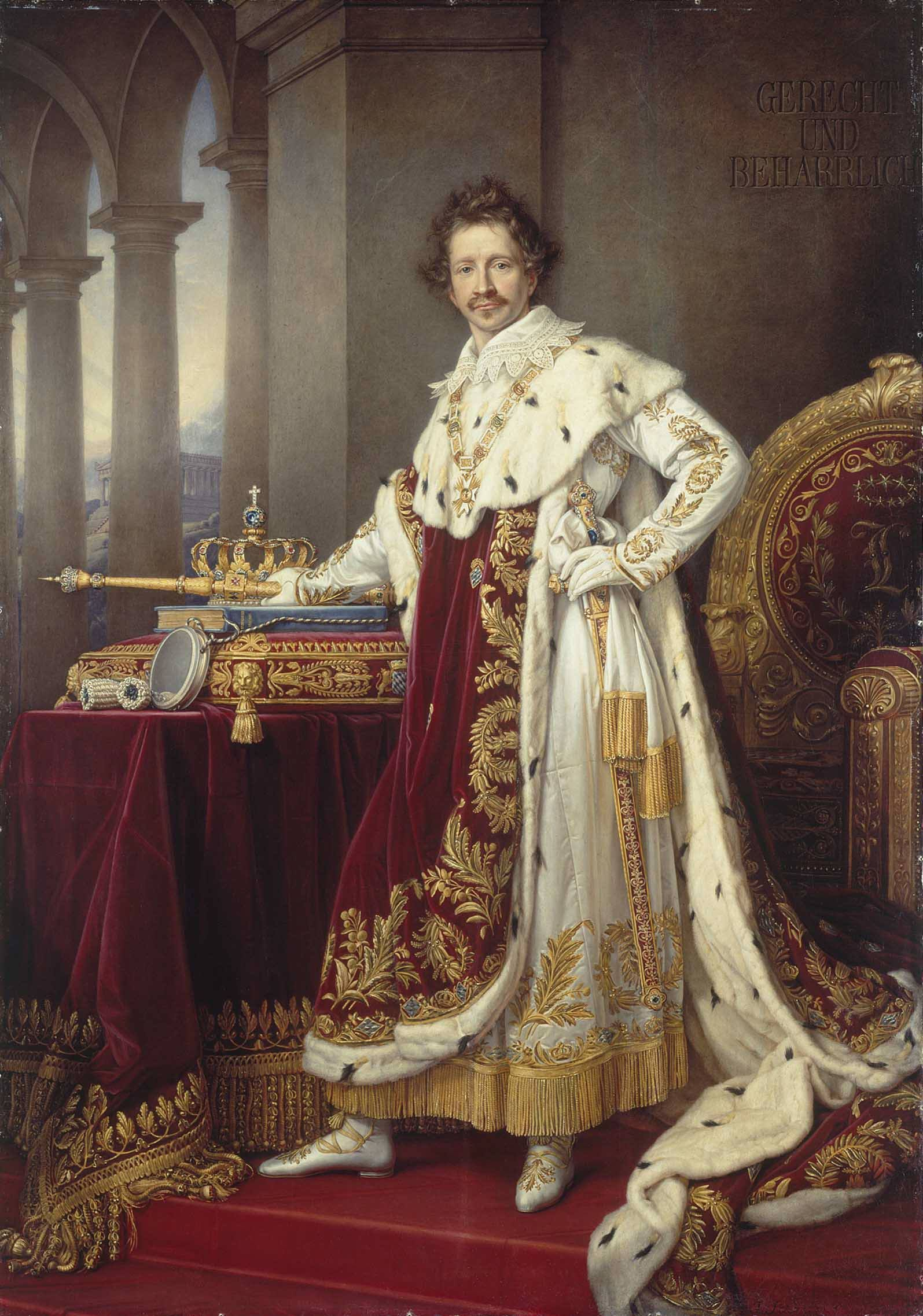
Portrait of Ludwig I of Bavaria by Joseph Karl Stieler. The nineteenth century King of Bavaria named the settlement after himself.

In 1808, during the French occupation, Carl Hornig of Mannheim purchased the fortress from the French authorities and turned it into a way station for passing river traffic. Later, the Rheinschanze with its winter-proof harbour basin (created by a flood in 1824) was used as a trading post. Hornig died in 1819, but Johann Heinrich Scharpff, a businessman from Speyer, continued Hornig's plans, which were then turned over to his son-in-law, Philipp Markus Lichtenberger, in 1830. Their activities marked the beginning of the civilian use of the Rheinschanze.

The official foundation of Ludwigshafen came in 1848, when Lichtenberger sold this property to the state of Bavaria, and the military title of the fortress was finally removed. The Bavarian king, Ludwig I, set forth plans to rename the settlement after himself and to start construction of an urban area as a Bavarian rival to Mannheim.

During the failed German revolution of 1848, rebels captured Ludwigshafen, but they were bombarded from Mannheim, and Prussian troops quickly expelled the revolutionaries. On 27 December 1852, King Maximilian II granted Ludwigshafen am Rhein political freedom and as of 8 November 1859, the settlement gained city status.

=== Industry and growth of population ===
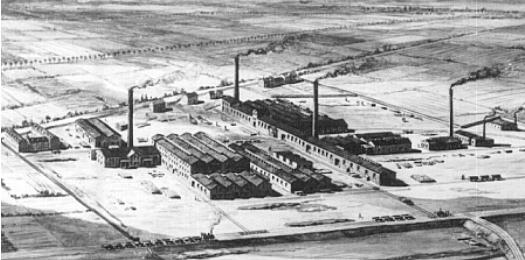
BASF, 1866

Historical population
Year	Pop.	±%
1840	90	—
1848	600	+566.7%
1852	1,400	+133.3%
1858	2,800	+100.0%
1871	7,900	+182.1%
1885	21,000	+165.8%
1895	40,000	+90.5%
1900	62,000	+55.0%
1914	94,000	+51.6%
1925	102,000	+8.5%
1939	144,000	+41.2%
1945	61,000	−57.6%
1950	124,000	+103.3%
1956	147,000	+18.5%
1970	180,000	+22.4%
1985	161,000	−10.6%
1995	171,000	+6.2%
2000	165,000	−3.5%
2004	166,000	+0.6%
2006	163,000	−1.8%
2018	171,000	+4.9%
Population size may be affected by changes in administrative divisions.

At its founding, Ludwigshafen was still a very modest settlement with just 1,500 inhabitants. Real growth began with industrialisation, and gained momentum due to the ideal transport facilities. In addition to its excellent position and harbour on the Rhine, a railway connecting Ludwigshafen with the Saar coalfields was completed in 1849.

In 1865, after several discussions, BASF decided to move its factories from Mannheim to the Hemshof district in Ludwigshafen. From then on, the city's rapid growth and wealth were linked to BASF's success and its expansion into becoming one of the world's most important chemical companies. Ludwigshafen also became home to several other rapidly growing chemical companies, including Friedrich Raschig GmbH, the Benckiser company (founded by Johann Benckiser), Giulini Brothers, Grünzweig&Hartmann AG, and Knoll AG.

With more jobs available, the population of Ludwigshafen increased rapidly. In 1899, the city was home to more than 62,000 residents.

This population explosion looked quite "American" to contemporaries; it determined Ludwigshafen's character as a "worker's city", and created problematic shortages of housing and real estate. The solution was the expansion of the municipal area with the incorporation of the two nearest villages, Friesenheim and Mundenheim, in 1892 and 1899 respectively. Between the city centre and these two suburbs, new areas (referred to as "North" and "South") were built following modern urban development plans. As the ground was marshy and too low to be protected from Rhine floods, all the new houses were built on raised ground, sometimes as high as 5 metres above the original level. As a result, back gardens in Ludwigshafen are sometimes up to two floors below street level.

=== World War I and World War II ===
During World War I (1914–1918), Ludwigshafen's industrial plants played a key role in Germany's war economy, producing chemical ingredients for munitions, as well as much of the poison gas used on the Western Front. This contributed to Ludwigshafen, on 27 May 1915, being the target of the world's first strategic aerial bombardment. French aircraft attacked the BASF plants, killing twelve people.

After the German surrender in 1918, the left bank of the Rhine was occupied by French troops, in accordance with the terms of the peace agreement. The French occupation lasted until 1930, and some of Ludwigshafen's most elegant houses were erected for the officers of the French garrison.

The economic recovery of the 1920s was marred by one of the worst industrial explosions in history on 21 September 1921, when a BASF storage silo in Oppau blew up, killing more than 500 people, injuring a further 2000, and destroying numerous buildings.

Despite this setback, Ludwigshafen reached a population of 100,000 in 1922, thus gaining "City" status. It prospered until 1929 and the onset of the Great Depression, which brought unemployment, labour trouble, political strife, and the rise of the Nazis.

Between 1930 and 1932, the Nazi Party returned the most votes within the Palatinate electoral district, containing Ludwigshafen, at all elections. They received 22.8% in September 1930, 43.7% and 42.5% in July and November 1932, and 46.5% in March 1933. This was above the proportions returned nationally in the democratic elections between 1930 and 1932 of 18,3%, 37,4% and 33,1% respectively.

Ludwigshafen saw further development during Nazi rule, with many small houses with gardens being built, especially in the Gartenstadt. Additionally, similar to plans in other cities (e.g. Hamburg), the Nazis sought to create a "Greater Ludwigshafen" by agglomerating smaller towns and villages in the vicinity. Thus, Oggersheim, Oppau, Edigheim, Rheingönheim, and Maudach became suburbs of Ludwigshafen, raising its population to 135,000. The Ludwigshafen synagogue was destroyed in 1938 and its Jewish population of 1,400 people was deported in 1940.

During the Oil Campaign of World War II, the Allies conducted bombing of Ludwigshafen and Oppau. Thirteen thousand Allied bombers hit the city in 121 separate raids during the war, of which 56 succeeded in hitting the IG Farben plant. Those 56 raids dropped 53,000 bombs, each containing 250 to 4,000 pounds of high explosives, plus 2,5 million 4-pound magnesium incendiary bombs. The bombers also dropped millions of leaflets warning the civilians to evacuate the city and counterfeit ration coupons. By December 1944, so much damage had been done to vital utilities that output dropped to nearly zero. Weekly follow-up raids ended production permanently. By the end of the war, most dwellings had been destroyed or damaged; 1,800 people had died, and 3,000 were injured.

The Allied ground advance into Germany reached Ludwigshafen in March 1945. The US 12th Armored Division and 94th Infantry Division captured Ludwigshafen against determined German resistance in house-to-house and block-to-block urban combat from 21 to 24 March 1945.

=== Post-war rebuilding ===
Post-war, Ludwigshafen was part of the French occupation zone, becoming part of the newly founded Bundesland (state) of Rheinland-Pfalz and thus part of the Federal Republic of Germany. Reconstruction of the devastated city and revival of the economy were supported by the Allies, especially by American aid. In 1948, the "Pasadena Shares Committee" sent packages of blankets, clothing, food, and medicines to help the residents of post-war Ludwigshafen. In 1956, Ludwigshafen am Rhein and Pasadena, California became sister cities.

Large parts of the city were in ruins and were rebuilt in the architectural style of the 1950s and 1960s. The most important projects were the Hochstraßen (highways on stilts), the revolutionary new main station (then the most modern station in Europe), several tower blocks and a whole new suburb, the satellite quarter Pfingstweide north of Edigheim.

The city's economic wealth allowed social benefits and institutions to be introduced. The population number reached an all-time high in 1970 with more than 180,000 inhabitants, thus surpassing even the capital of Rheinland-Pfalz, Mainz, at the time.

=== Financial crisis ===
In the early 1970s, a plan to reform the composition of the German Bundesländer, which would have created a new state around a united Mannheim-Ludwigshafen as capital, failed.

Nevertheless, further ambitious projects were financed in Ludwigshafen, beginning with the 15-floor city hall with its connected shopping centre (Rathaus Centre). The suburb to be incorporated was Ruchheim in 1974.

During the 1980s and 1990s, the enormous maintenance costs of the buildings and institutions introduced during the "fat time", new tax regulations that cut down the trade tax profits from the local industries, and thousands of dismissals at BASF caused a financial crisis for the city. Reduction in population due to the loss of jobs and the general economic situation further worsened Ludwigshafen's financial situation at the end of the 20th century.

=== Contemporary Ludwigshafen ===
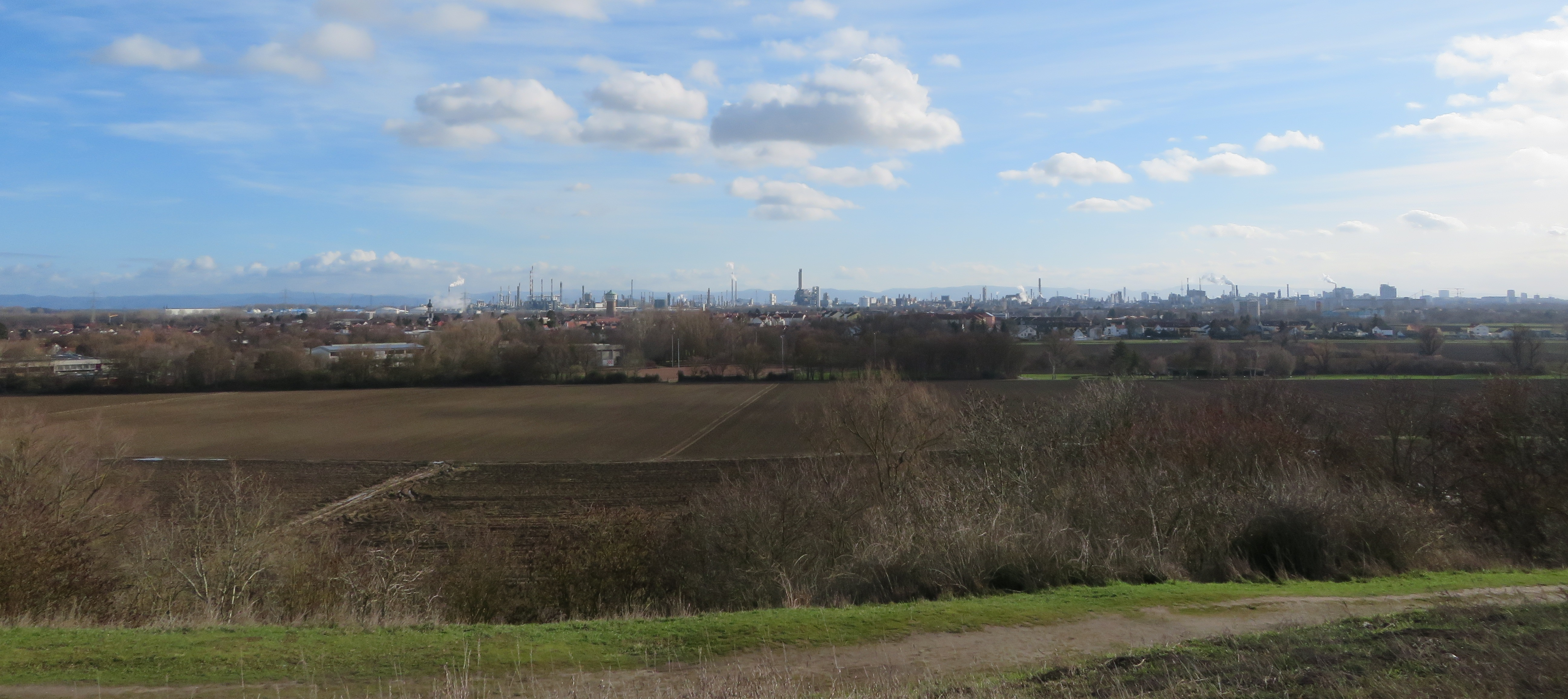
View from west over Edigheim and Oppau to the BASF Ludwigshafen

In recent years, efforts have been made to enhance Ludwigshafen's image in the media. The city administration has cut down its deficit by reducing social payments and maintenance, pollution has been reduced and the Hemshof quarter has been restored.

In 2008, a fire broke out in a residential building. 9 people died, all of them Turks and 5 of them children. Investigators confirmed the blaze was not arson.

In response to concerns about limited retail options, the city developed new shopping facilities, including the Walzmühle shopping mall near Berliner Platz, adjacent to the Ludwigshafen-Mitte railway station. Additionally, the Rhein-Galerie shopping mall, featuring approximately 130 stores over 30,000 square meters, opened on 29 September 2010 on the former Zollhofhafen harbour site, aiming to revitalise the waterfront area.

Largest groups of foreign residents
Nationality	Population
Turkey	9,010
Italy	6,309
Bulgaria	3,656
Poland	2,581
Romania	2,574
Greece	2,086
Croatia	1,821
Syria	1,730
Ukraine	1,647
Hungary	1,525
Serbia	1,437

== Districts ==
=== Centre ===
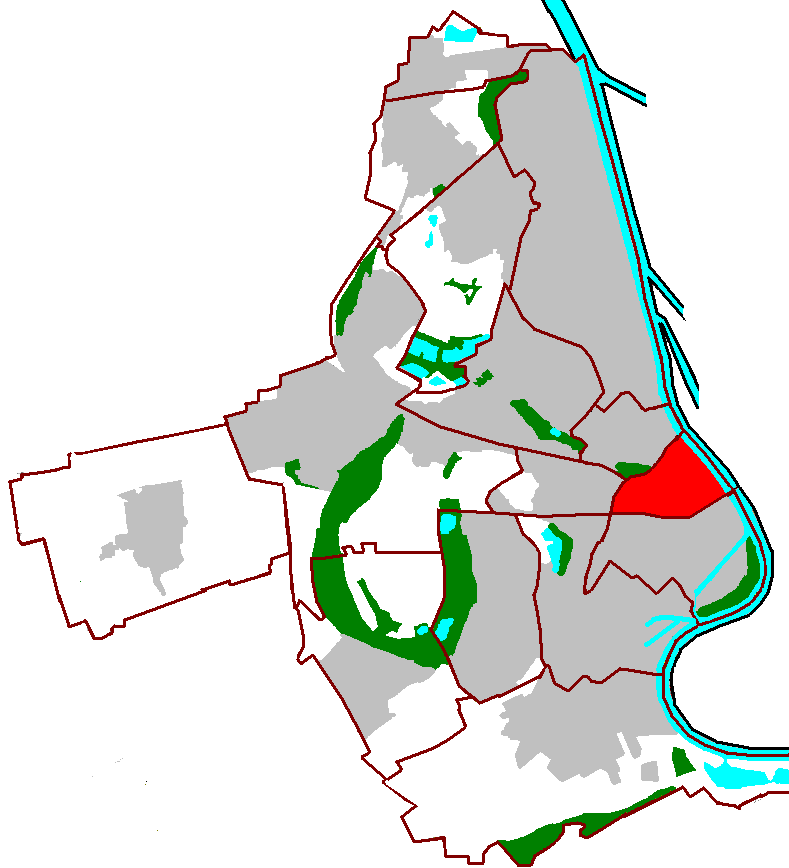

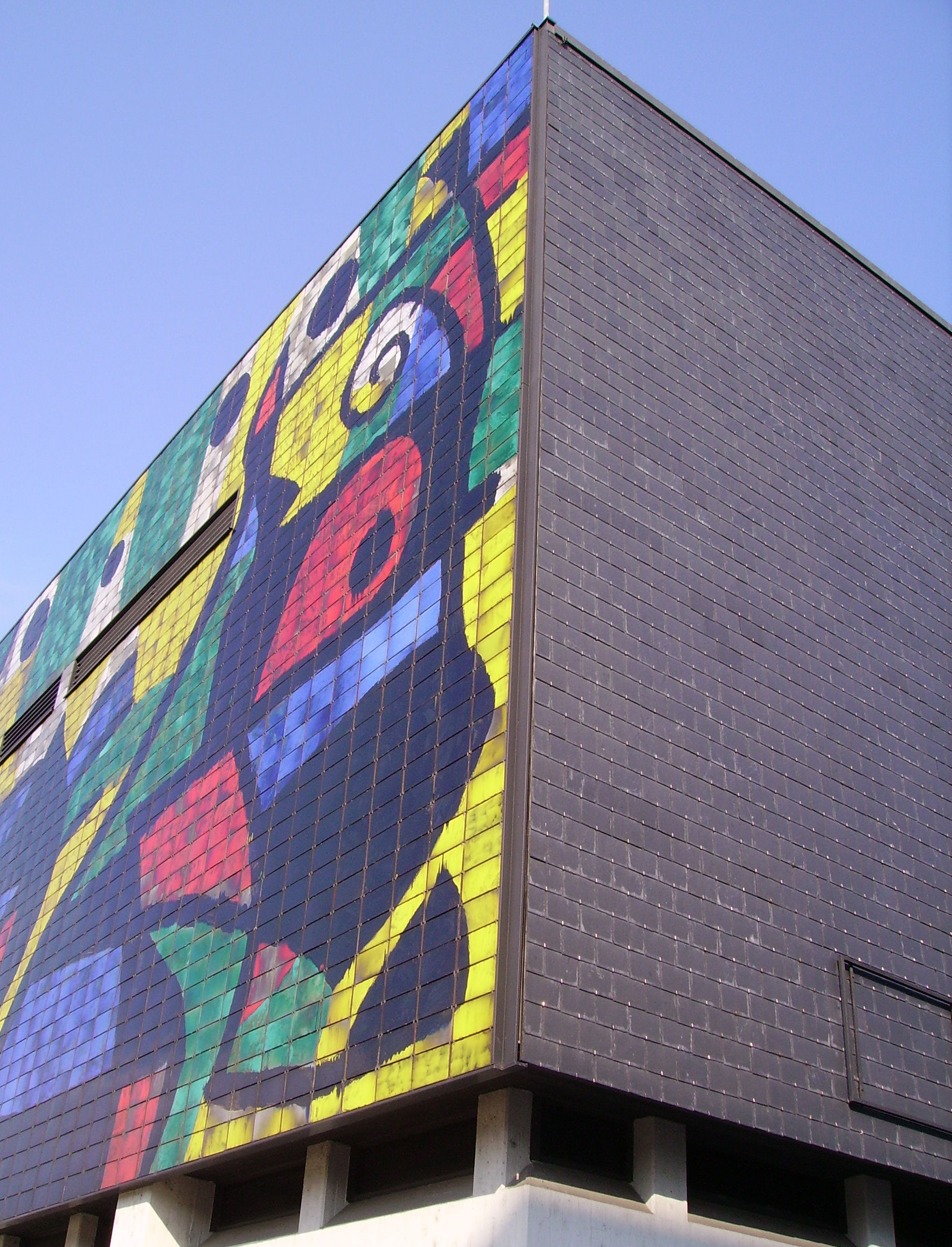
Wilhelm Hack Museum of Art. "Miró-Wand" mural (1971) by Joan Miró, in collaboration with the Catalan ceramist Joan Gardy Artigas.

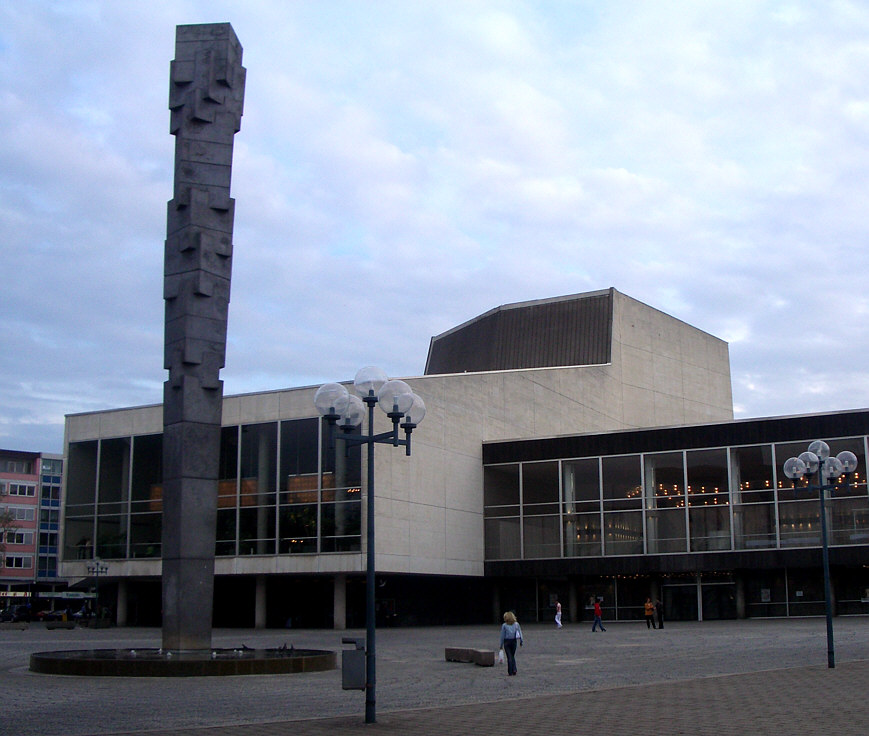
Pfalzbau concert hall and theater. In the foreground: "Pfalzsäule" (Palatinate Column, 1968), by the Munich artist Blasius Spreng and the local artist Ernst W. Kunz.

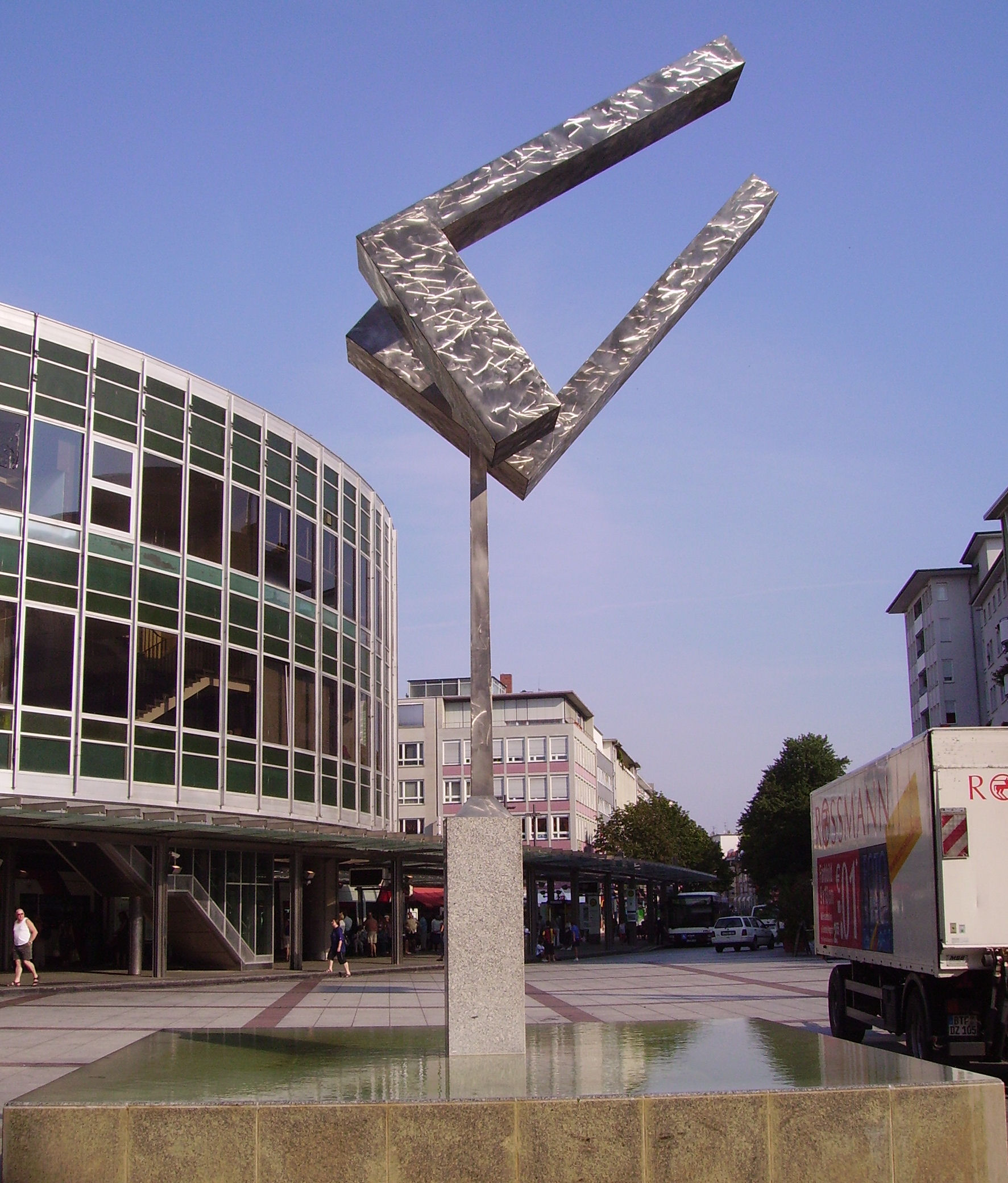
Berliner Platz. In the foreground: "Conversation II" (1999), kinetic sculpture by the American sculptor, George Rickey.

The city centre of Ludwigshafen is comparatively small and dominated by post-war buildings. Its northern and southern boundaries are the Hochstraßen (highways on stilts), the Rhine bounds the east and the main station is located to the west of central Ludwigshafen. The central pedestrian precinct Bismarckstraße forms, together with the shopping mile Ludwigsstraße, the main North-South Axis, connecting the so-called "North Pole" with the Rathaus Centre and the "South Pole" with Berliner Platz, the Walzmühle shopping centre and Ludwigshafen (Rhein) Mitte station. The main east–west connections are the Bahnhofsstraße and Kaiser-Wilhelm-Straße. The Pfalzbau, Staatsphilharmonie, Wilhelm-Hack-Museum and the half-destroyed monument Lutherkirche are the main features of central Ludwigshafen.

=== South ===
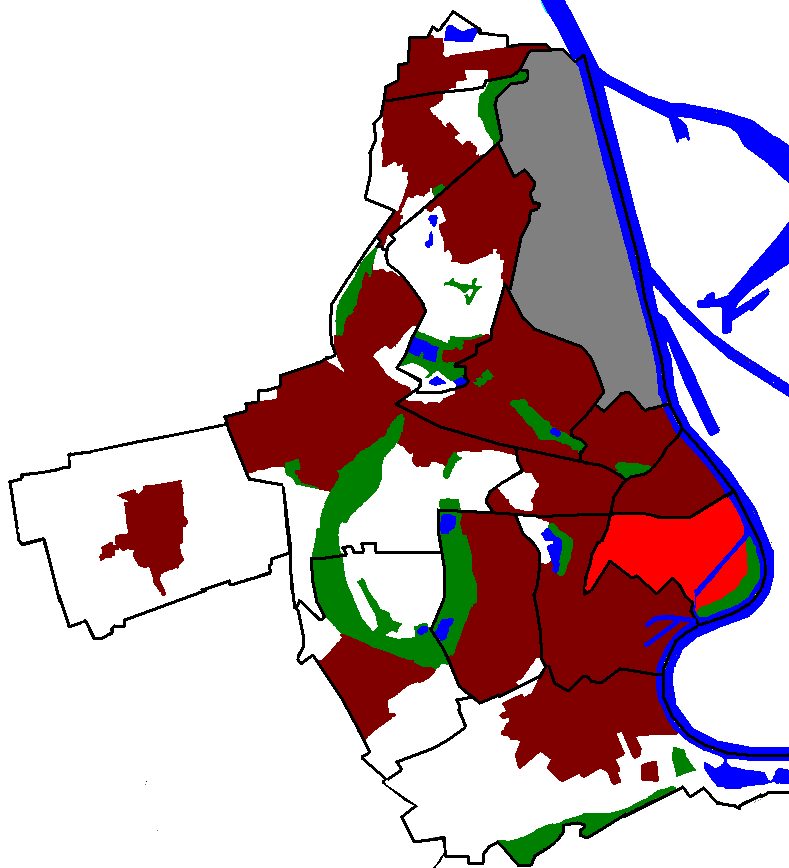
Position

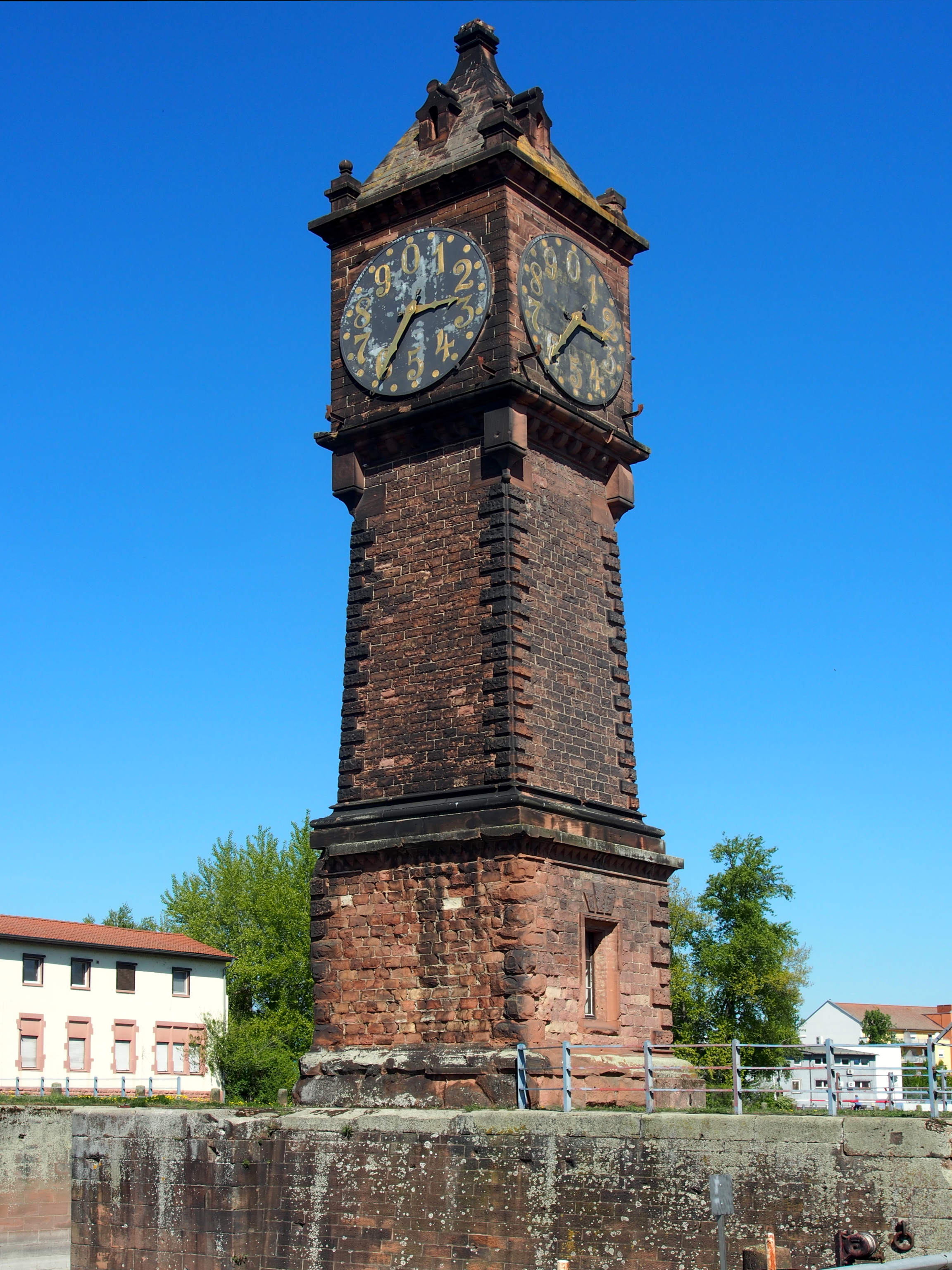
Pegeluhr

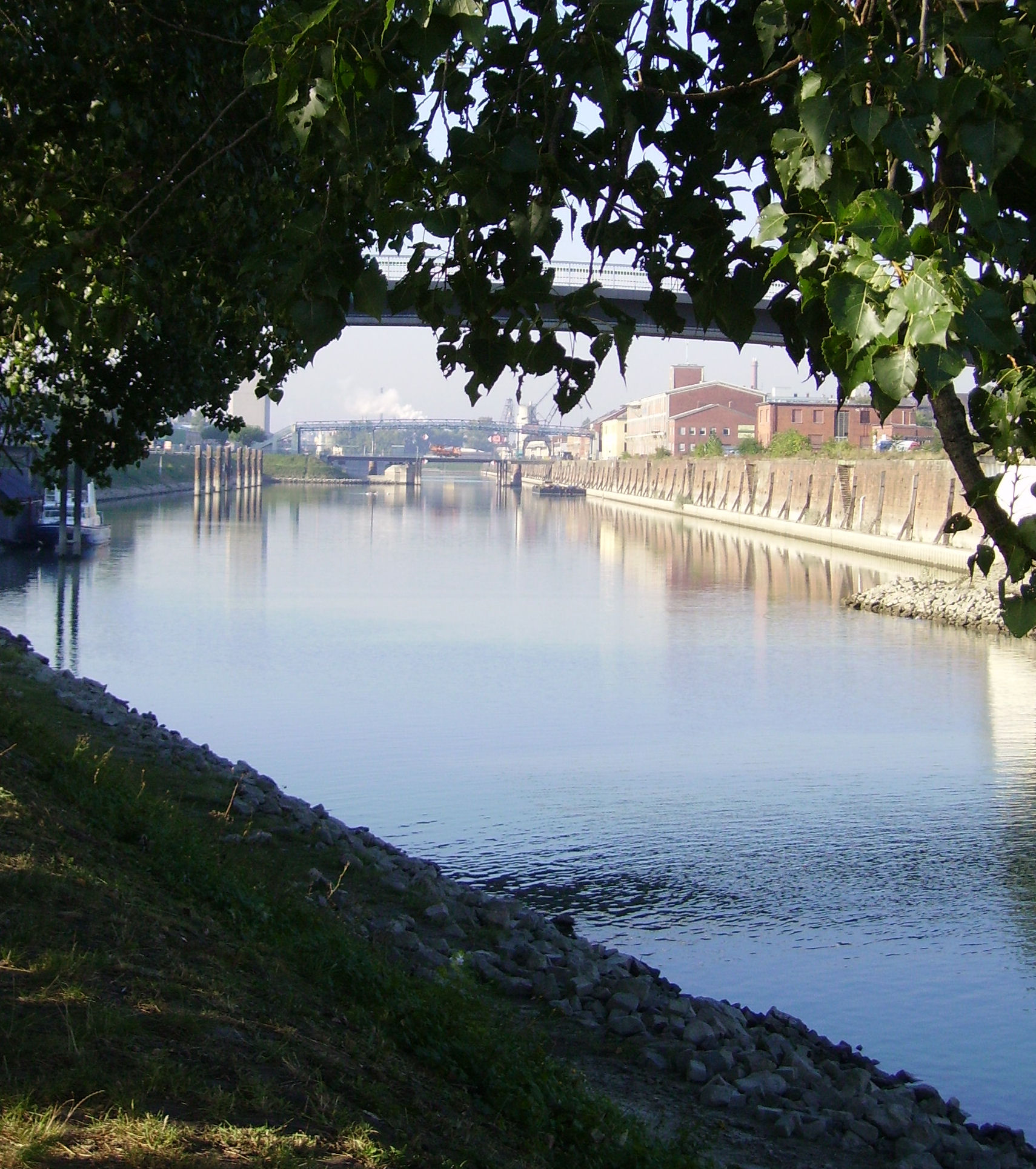
Harbour

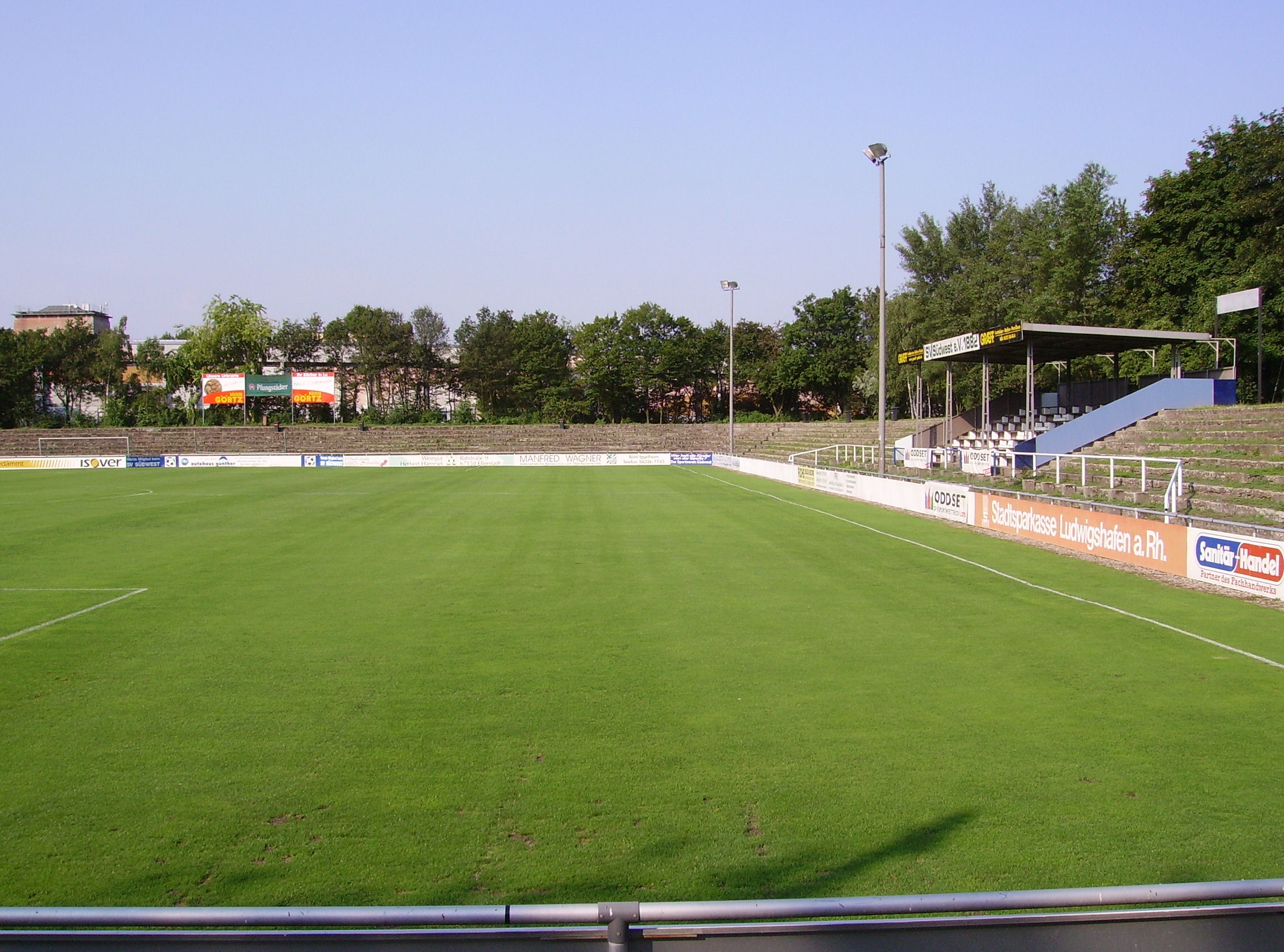
Südwestplatz

The Südliche Innenstadt ("Southern city centre") is home to approximately 29,000 residents and includes the central district and the Stadtteil Süd ("South district"). The South district contains sub-neighbourhoods including the Parkinsel (Park Island), Musikantenviertel (Musicians' Quarter), and Malerviertel (Artists' Quarter). Redevelopment plans have been promised for the Rheinufer Süd (Southern Riverbank) area along the Rhine, near the former industrial sites and the Walzmühle shopping complex.

=== North ===
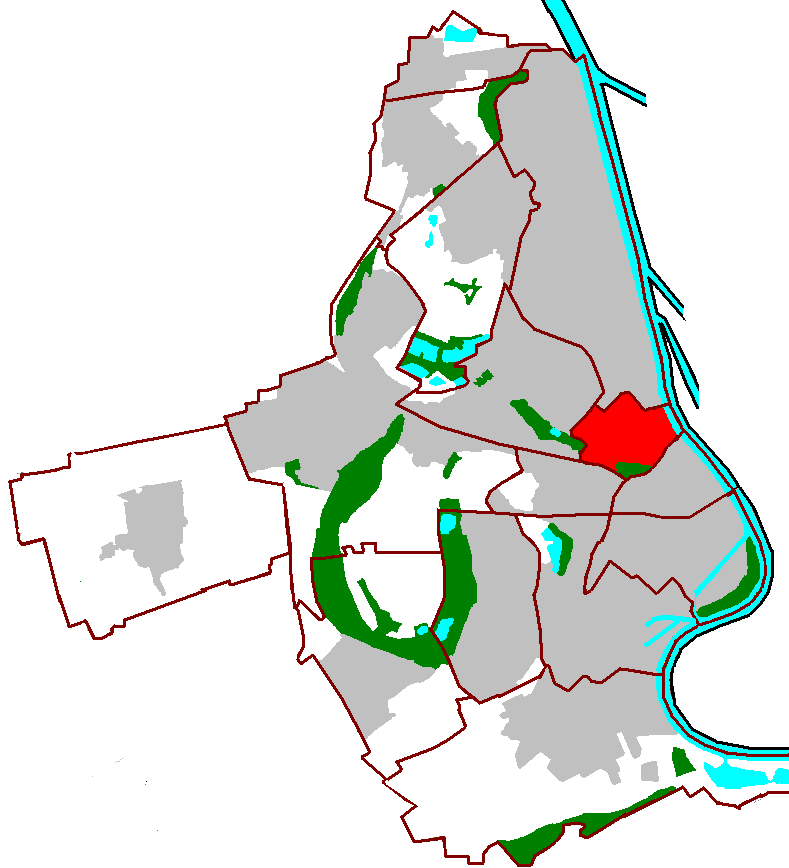
Position

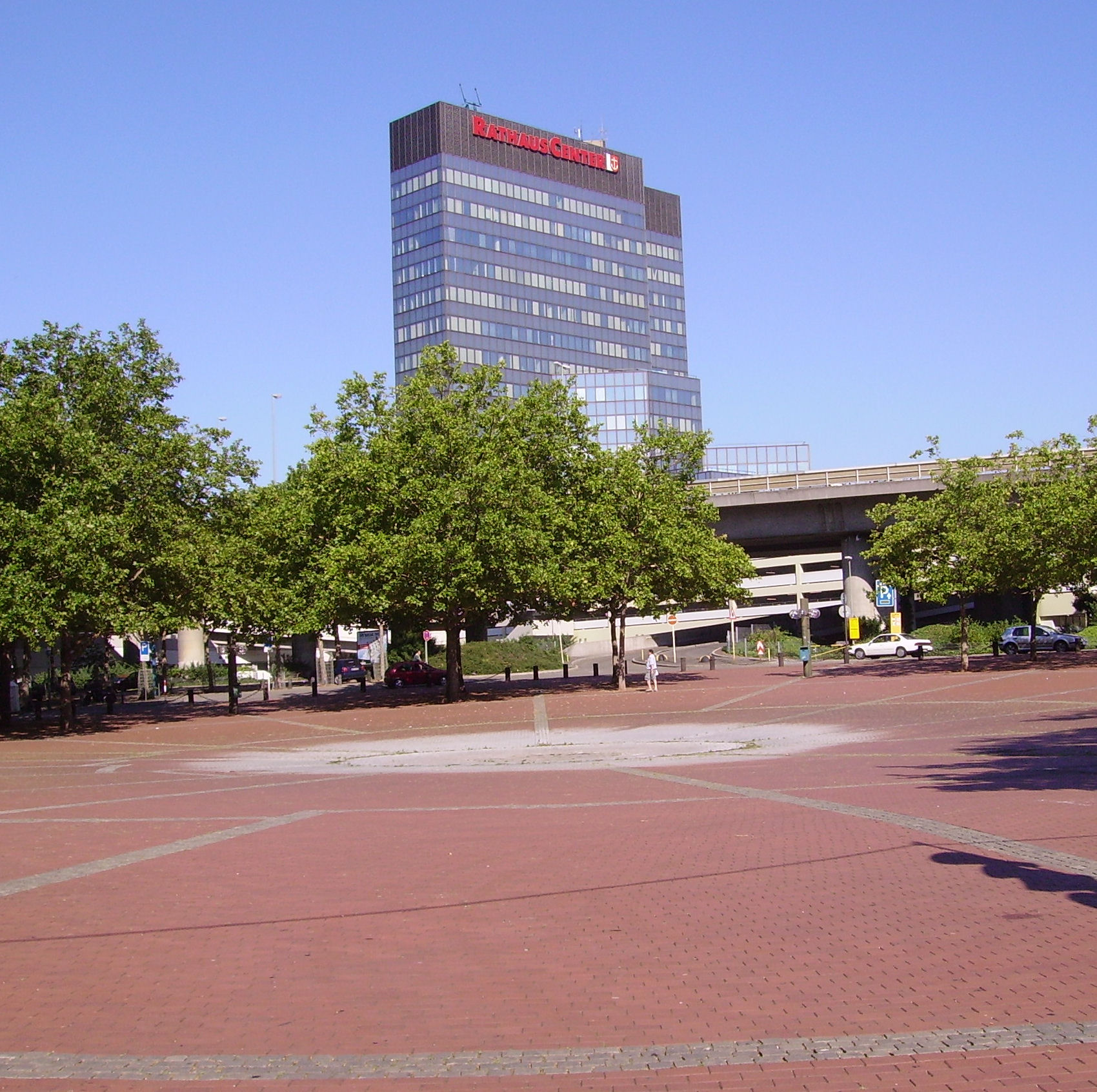
Europaplatz

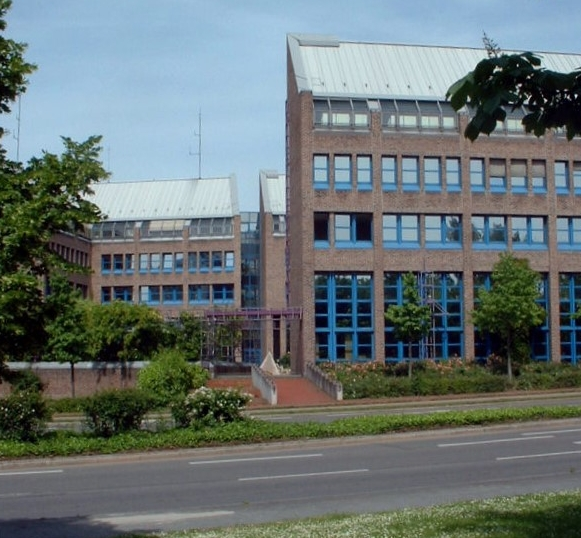
Landratsamt

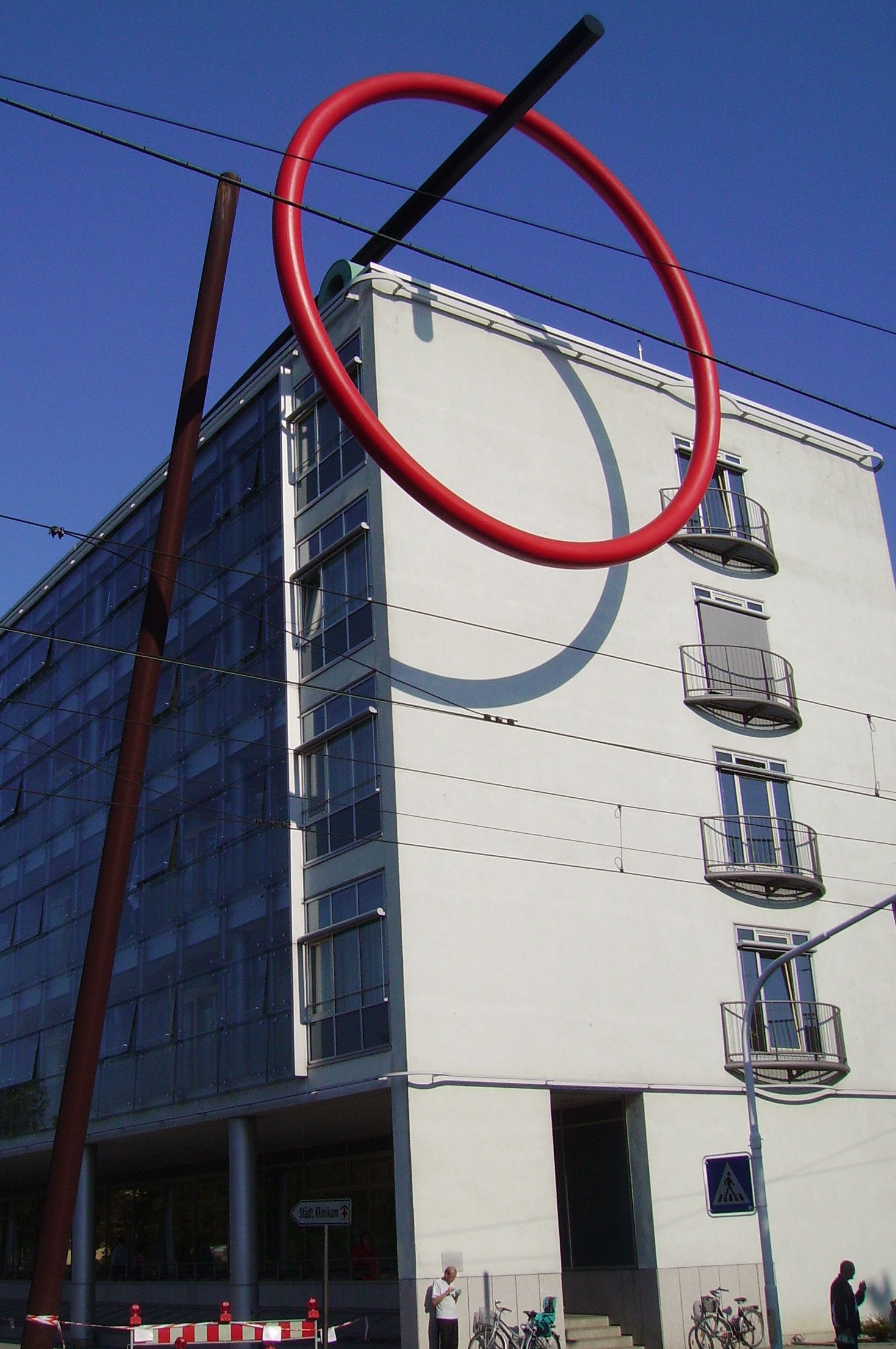
Municipal Clinic (Städtisches Klinikum), with the sculpture "Ring des Seyns" (The Ring of Being, 1998) by the Japanese conceptual artist, Kazuo Katase

The Nördliche Innenstadt (Northern City Centre) includes the Hemshof, "North" and "West" districts. Hemshof and "North" represent the "old town" of Ludwigshafen; they are known for their very high proportion of foreign inhabitants, making them culturally diverse. "West" (also called Valentin-Bauer-Siedlung) is located between the main station and main cemetery.

=== Friesenheim ===
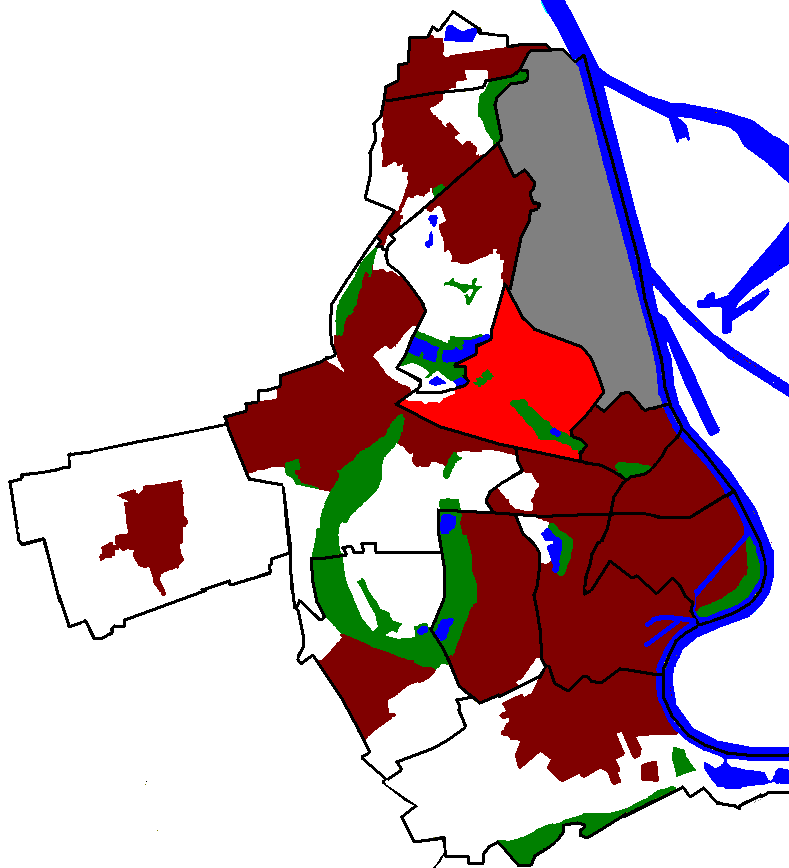
Position

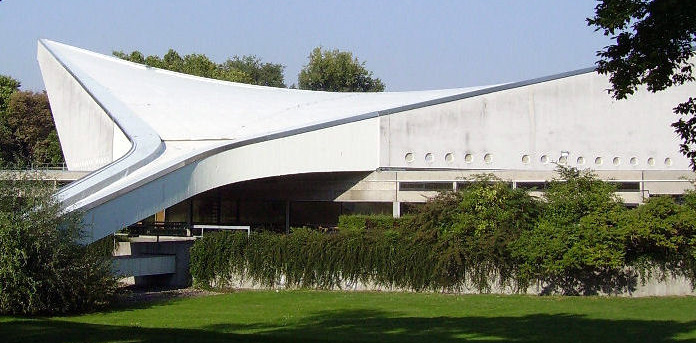
Detail of the Eberthalle, an exhibition and concert hall dating from 1965

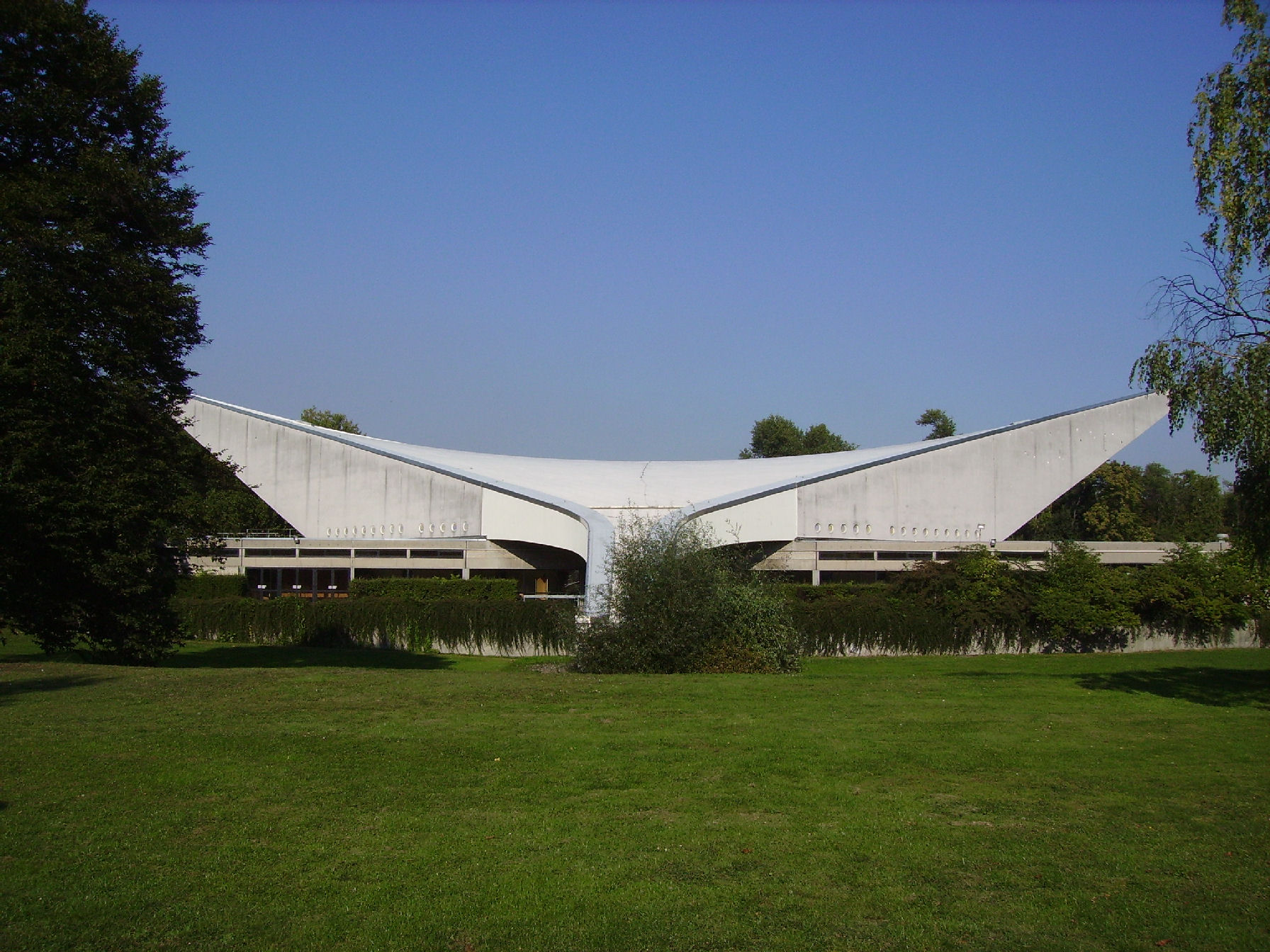
The Friedrich-Ebert-Halle (Eberthalle for short), general view, built by the Viennese architect, Roland Rainer, in 1965

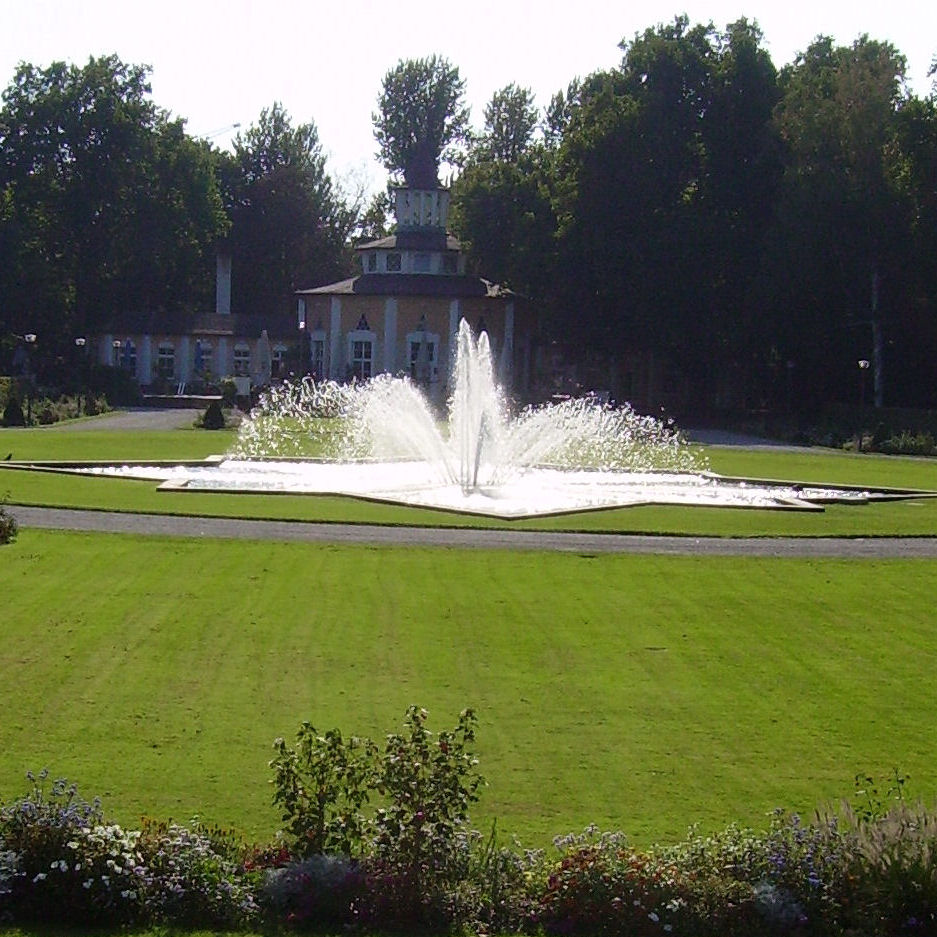
Ebertpark

Friesenheim (ca. 18,000 inhabitants) is located north of Hemshof and is one of two "mother villages" of Ludwigshafen (the other being Mundenheim), because they were responsible for the administration of Ludwigshafen prior to its independence. Helmut Kohl was born in Friesenheim. Its western district, the Froschlache, boasts four impressive tower blocks.

=== Oppau ===
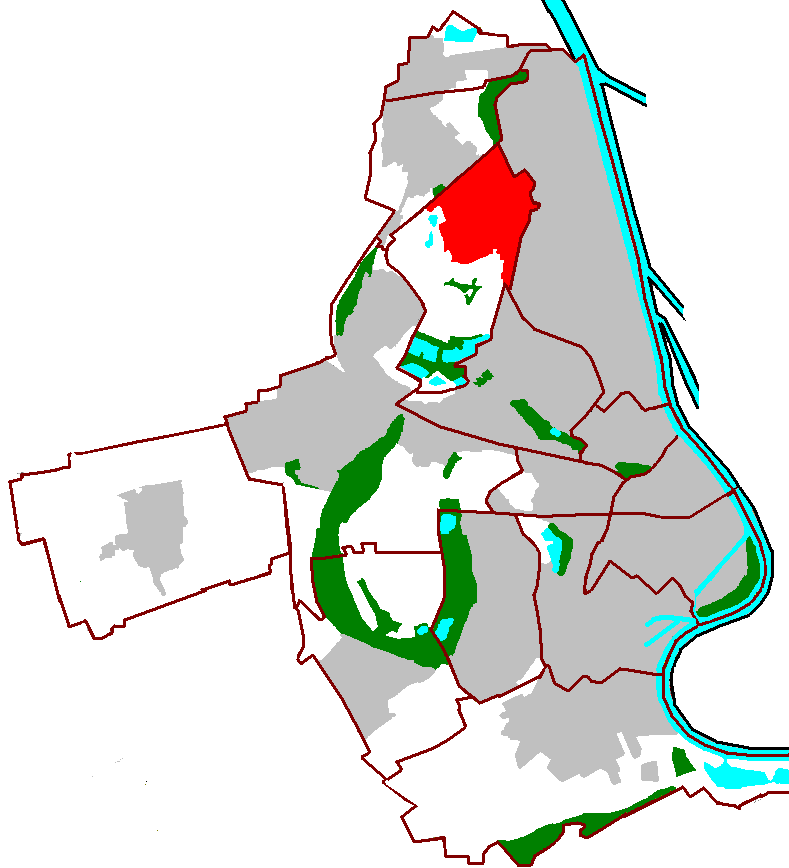
Position

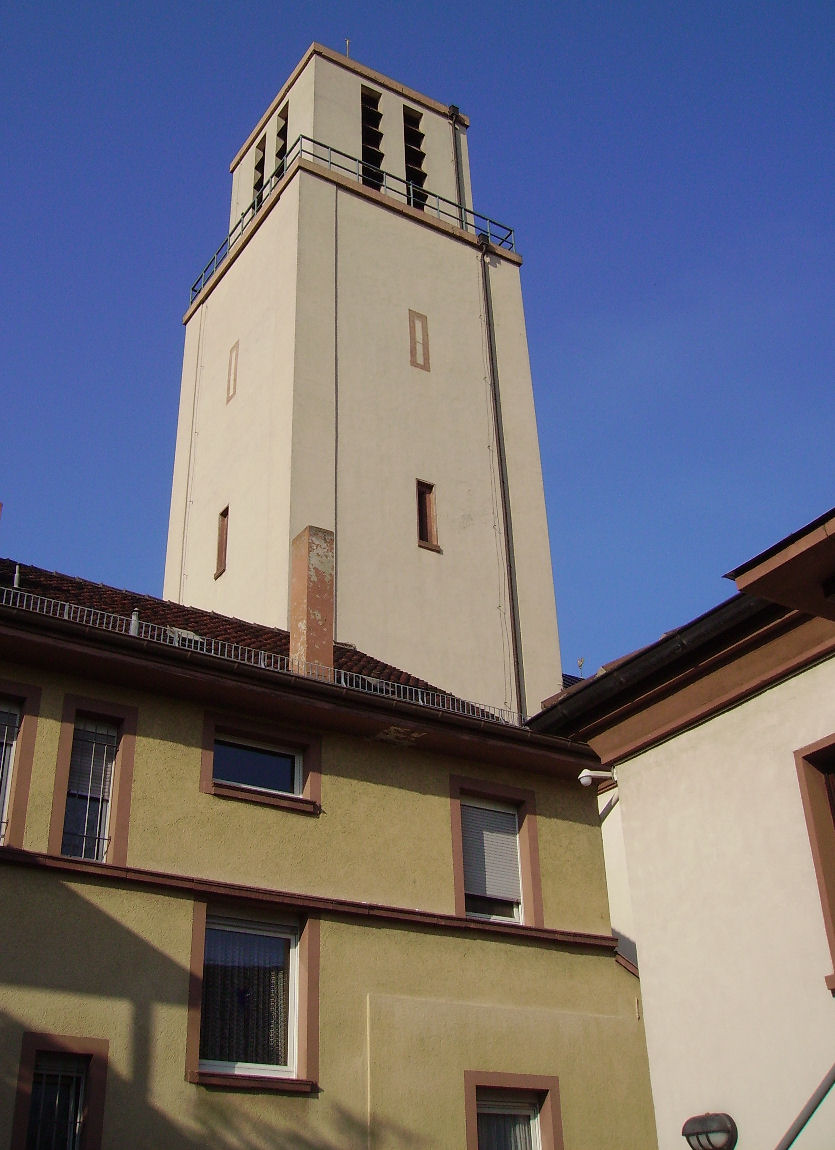
Catholic church

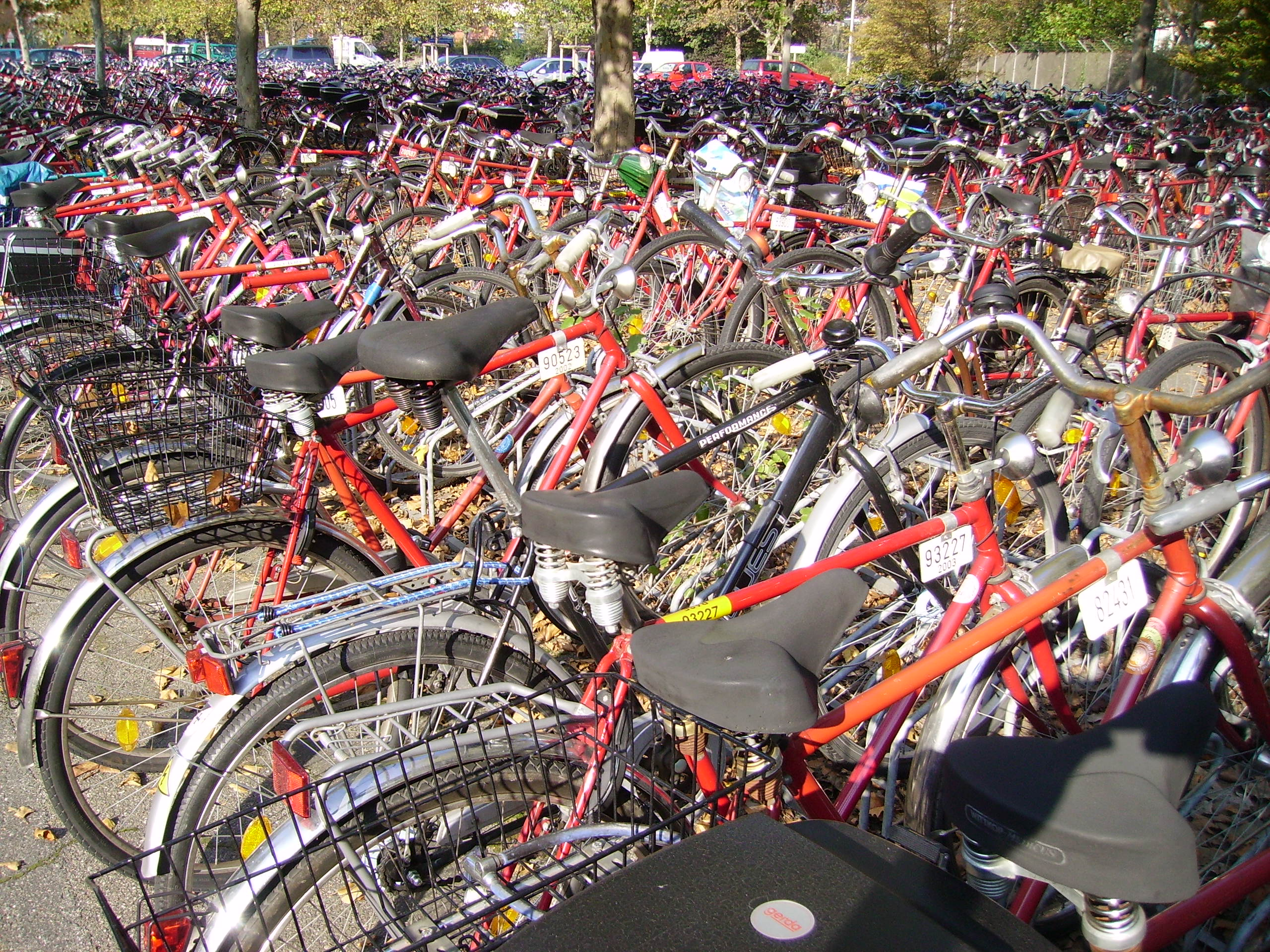
BASF bicycles

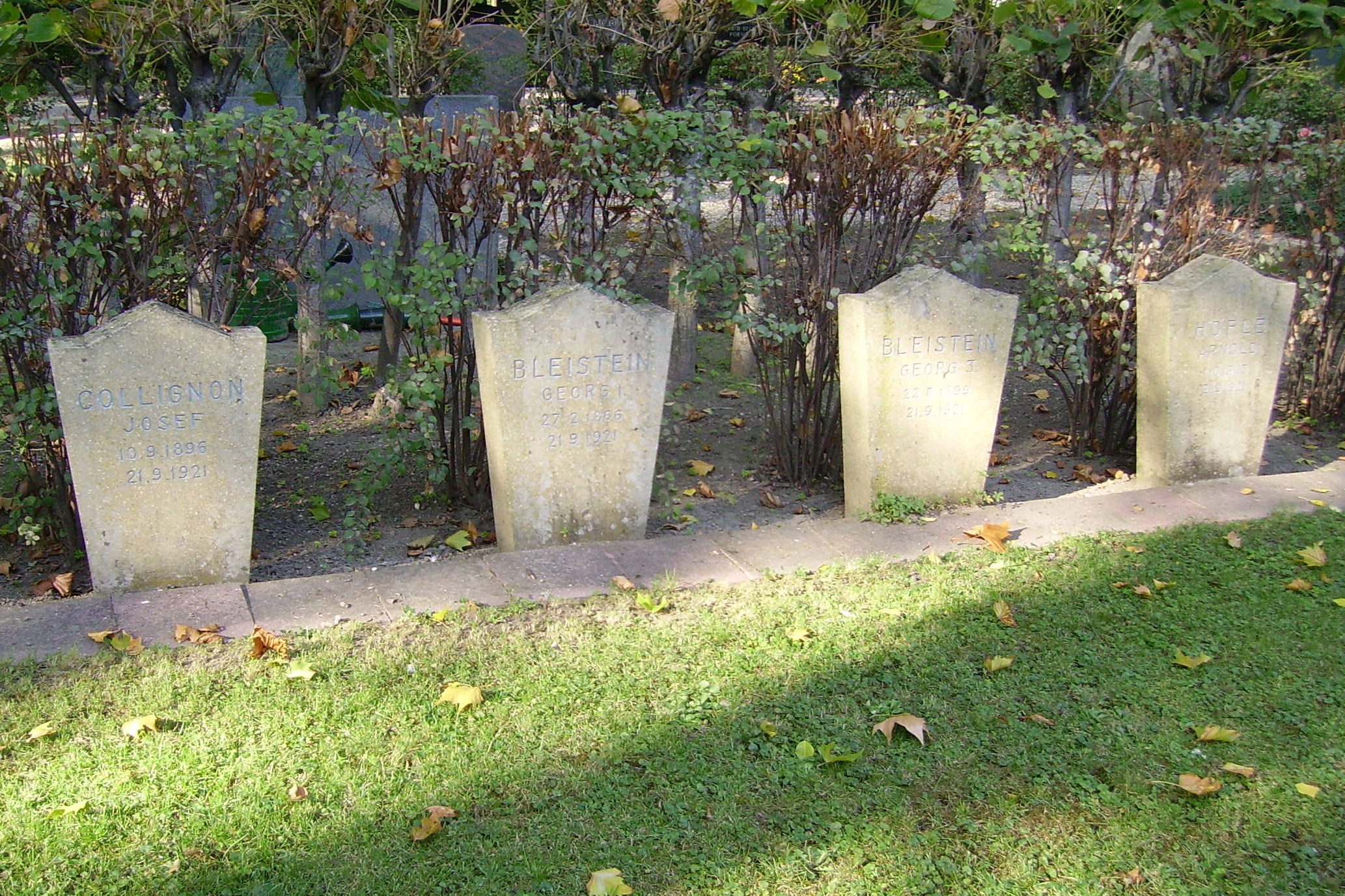
1921 memorial

Oppau (ca. 10,000 inhabitants) in the north is dominated by the nearby BASF plant and was once an independent town prior to its incorporation into Ludwigshafen. It has historically been afflicted by several catastrophes with the explosion of 1921 and the flood of 1882.

=== Edigheim ===
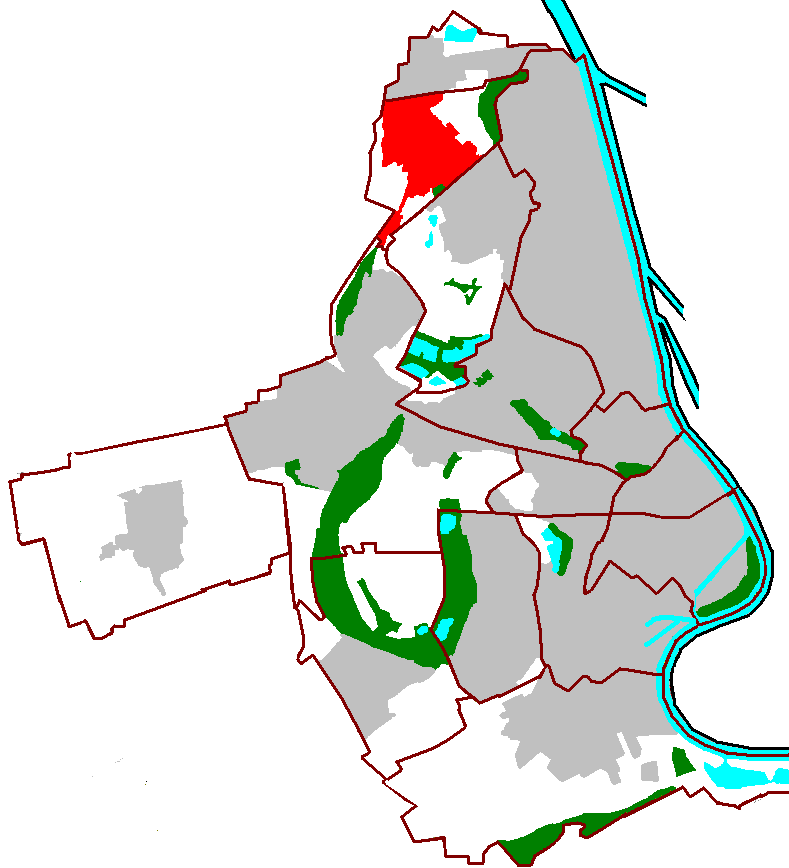
Position

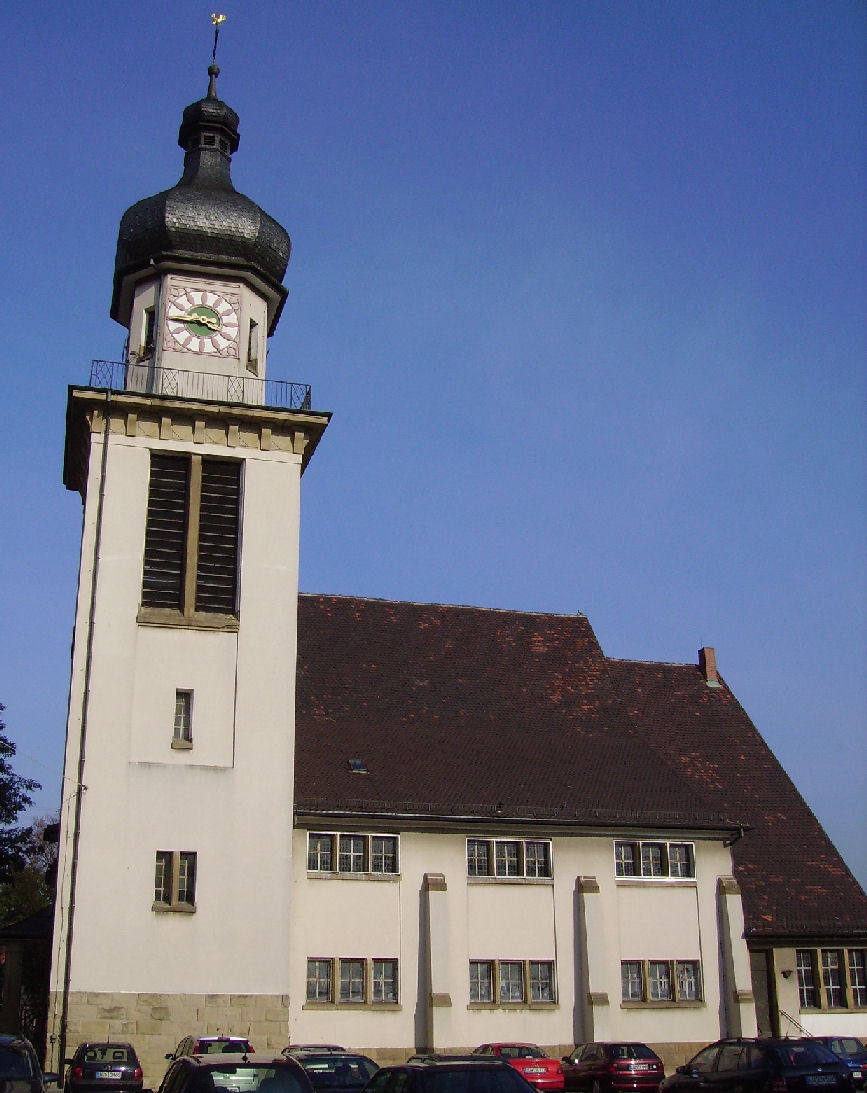
Church

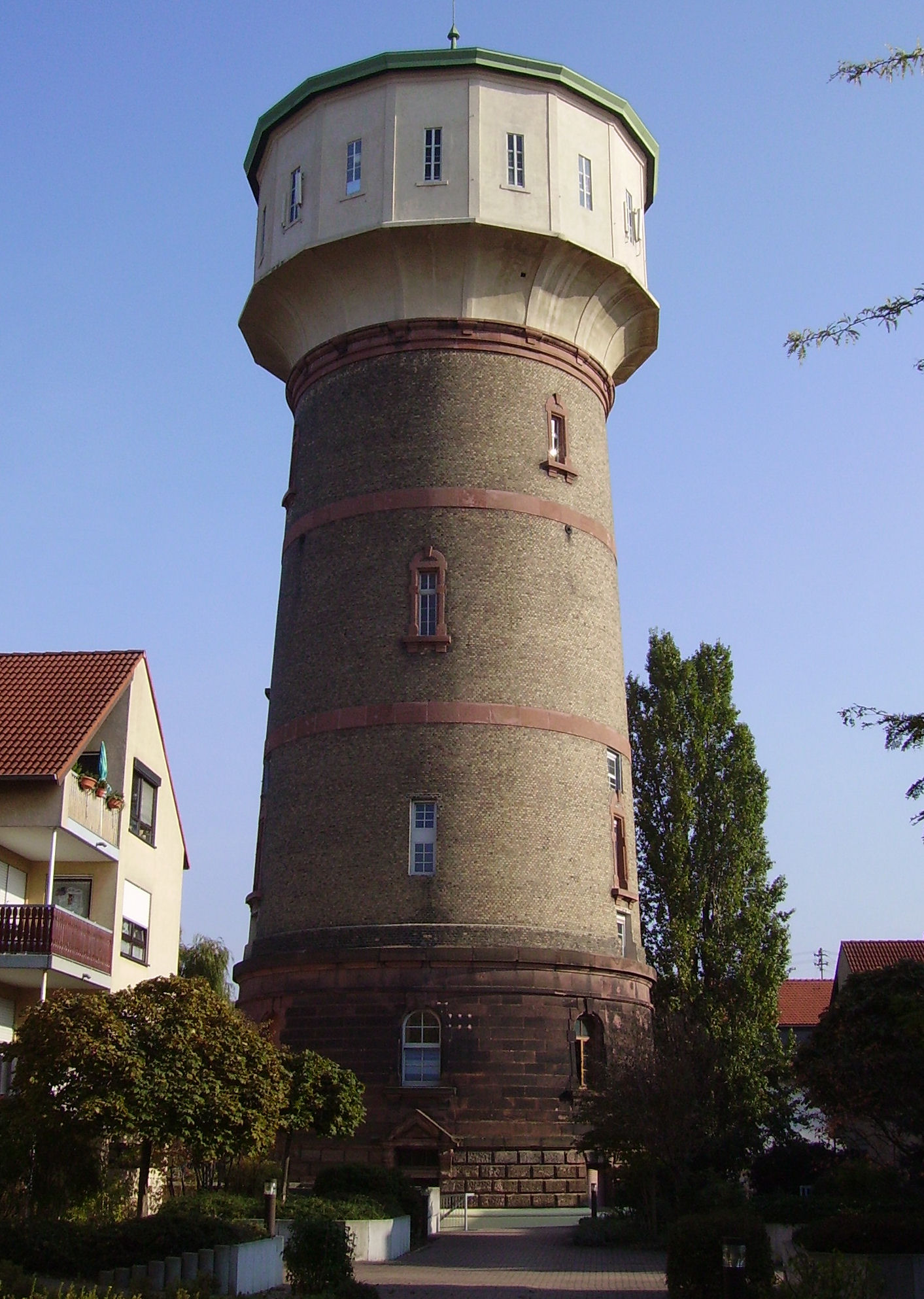
Water tower

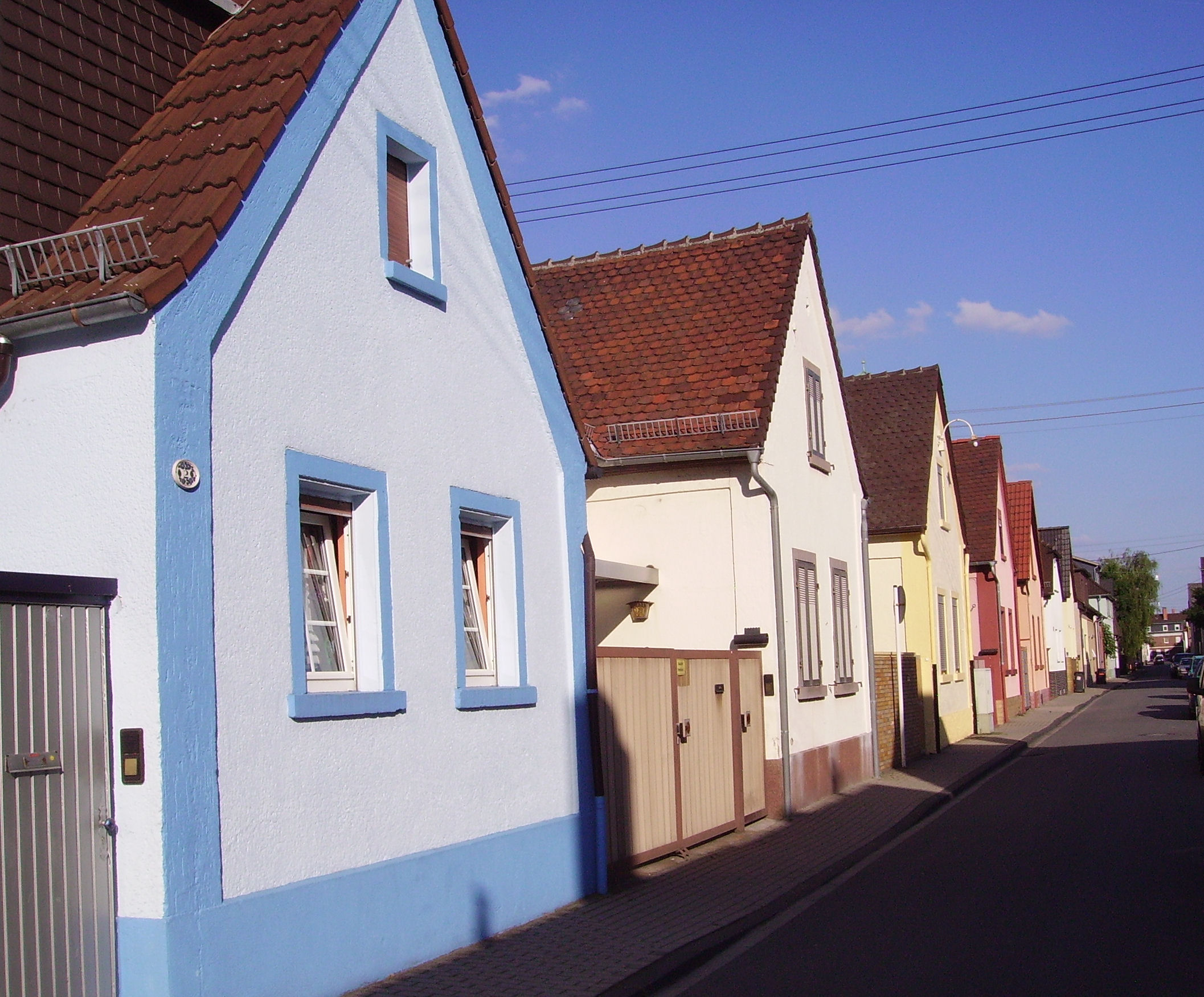
Street

Edigheim (ca. 9,000 inhabitants) was once part of Oppau to the south, but today is almost as large as Oppau. The Pfingstweide (ca. 6,000 inhabitants) is Ludwigshafen's northernmost district; it is dominated by tower blocks and is located in close vicinity to Frankenthal.

=== Gartenstadt ===
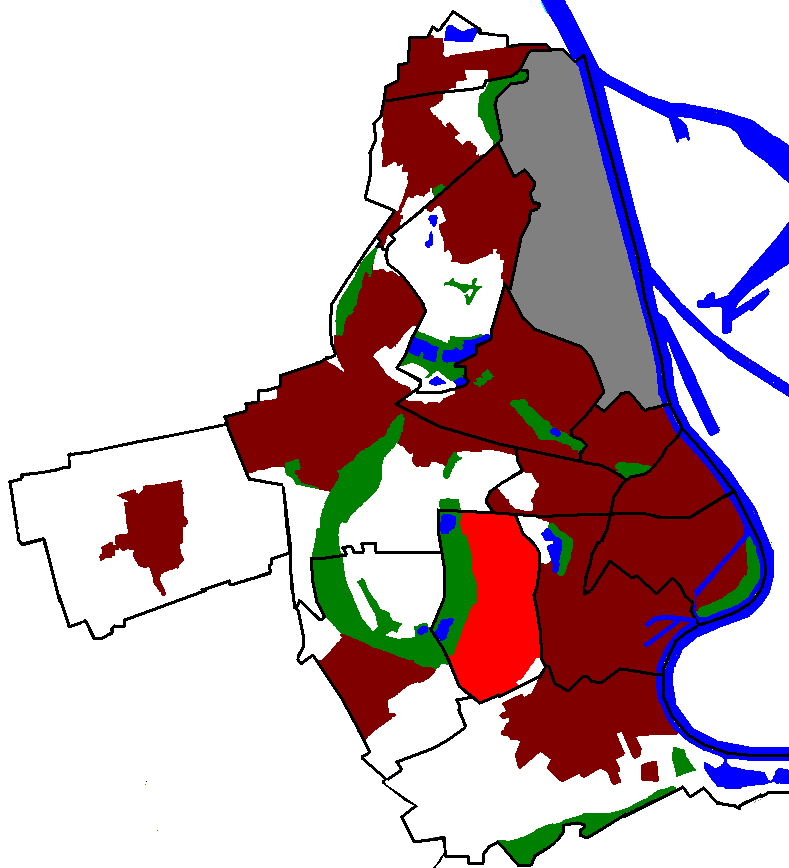
Position

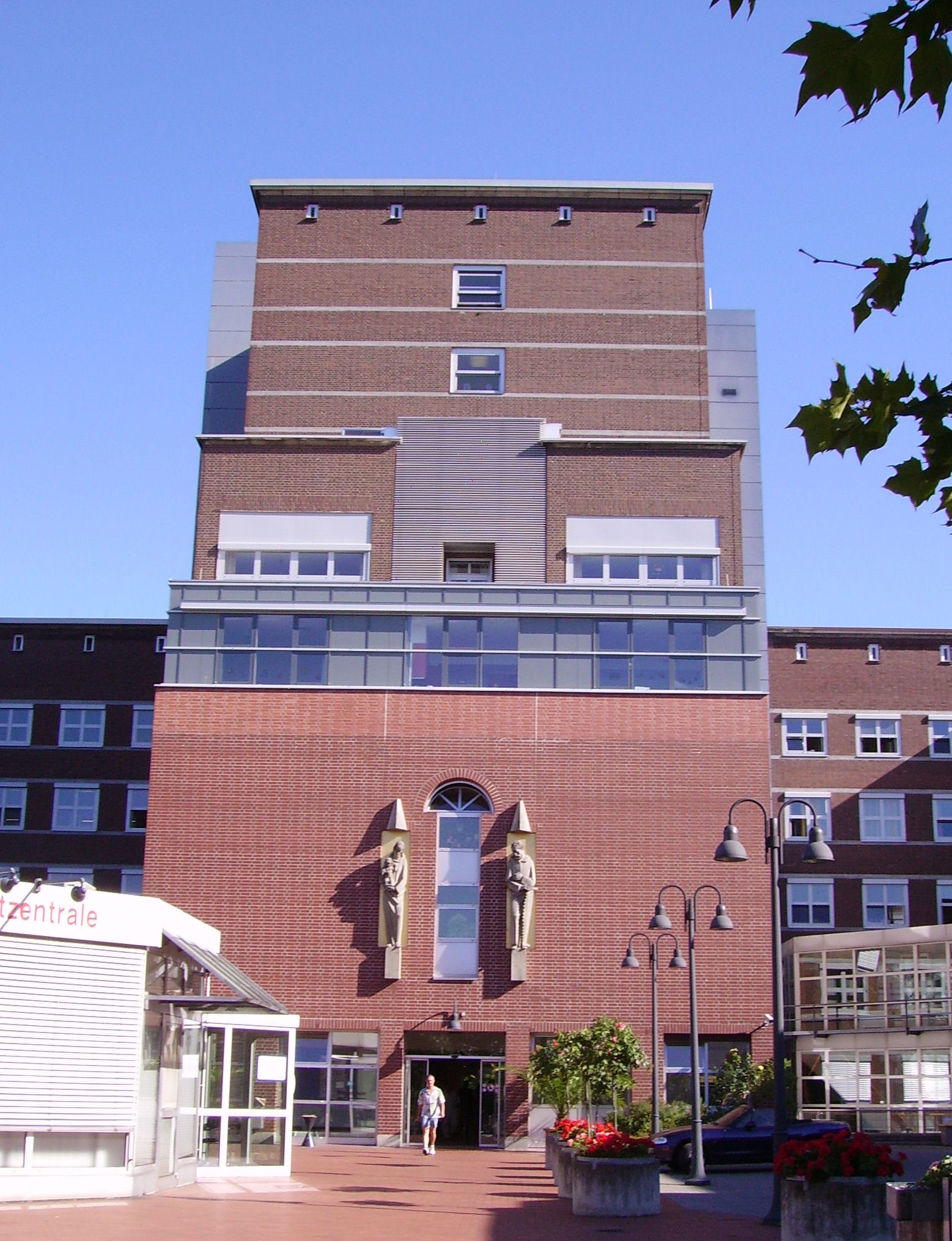
Hospital

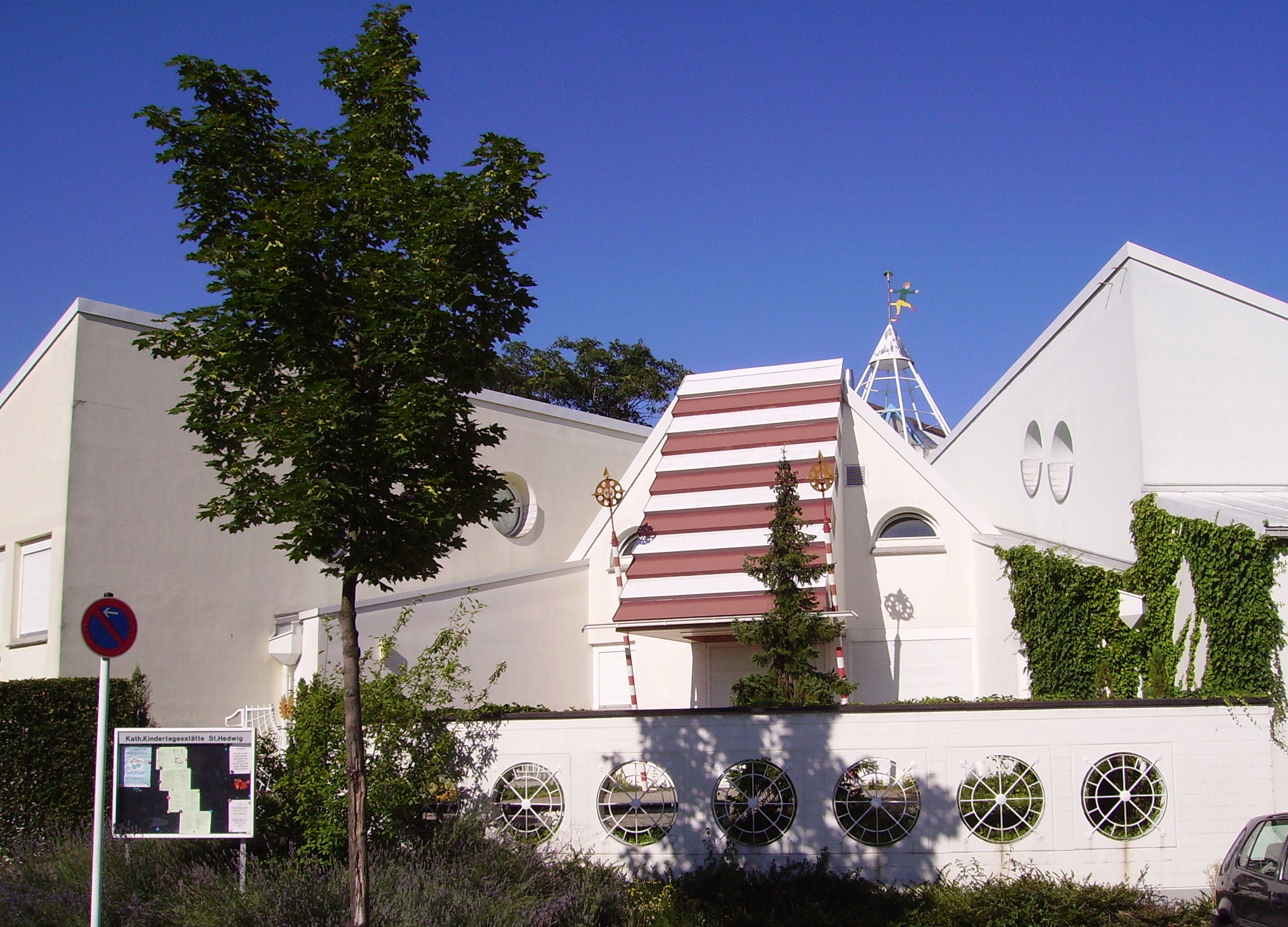
Kindergarten

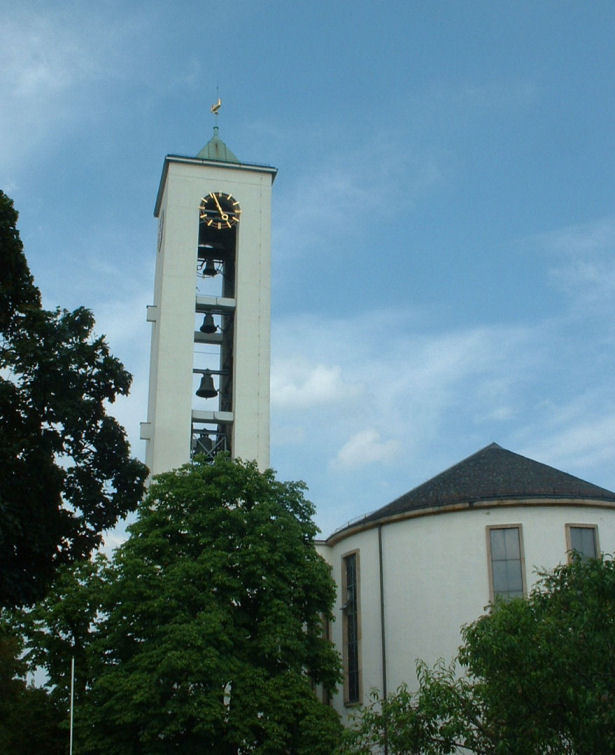
Church

The Gartenstadt (Garden City) with c. 18,000 inhabitants is, as the name suggests, a very green suburb, dominated by flat roofed houses and some tower blocks. Its sub-districts are Niederfeld, Hochfeld and Ernst-Reuter-Siedlung.

=== Mundenheim ===
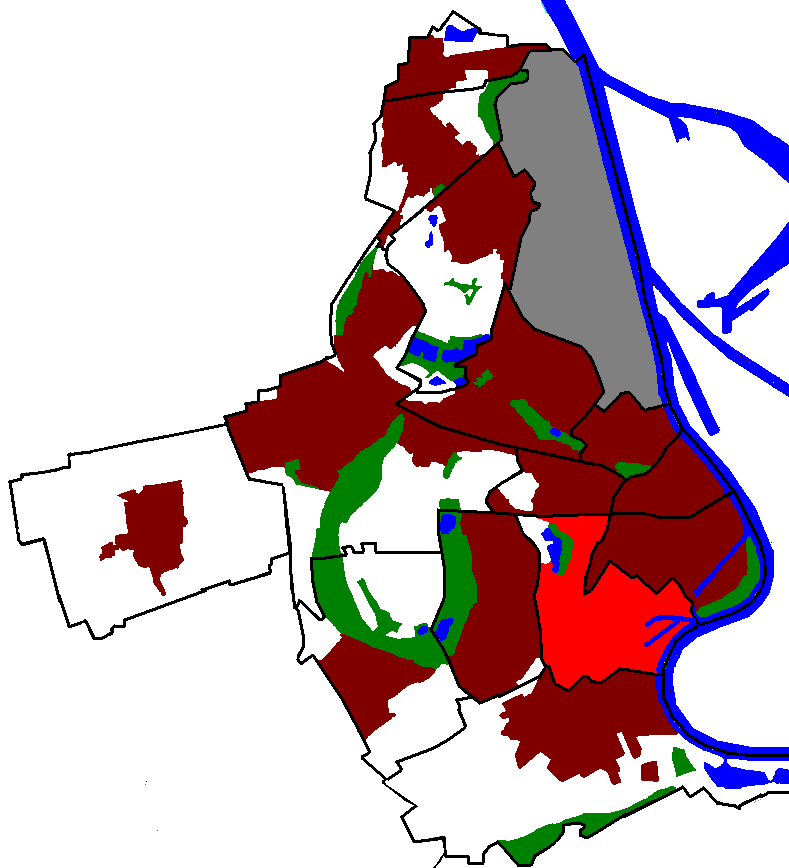
Position

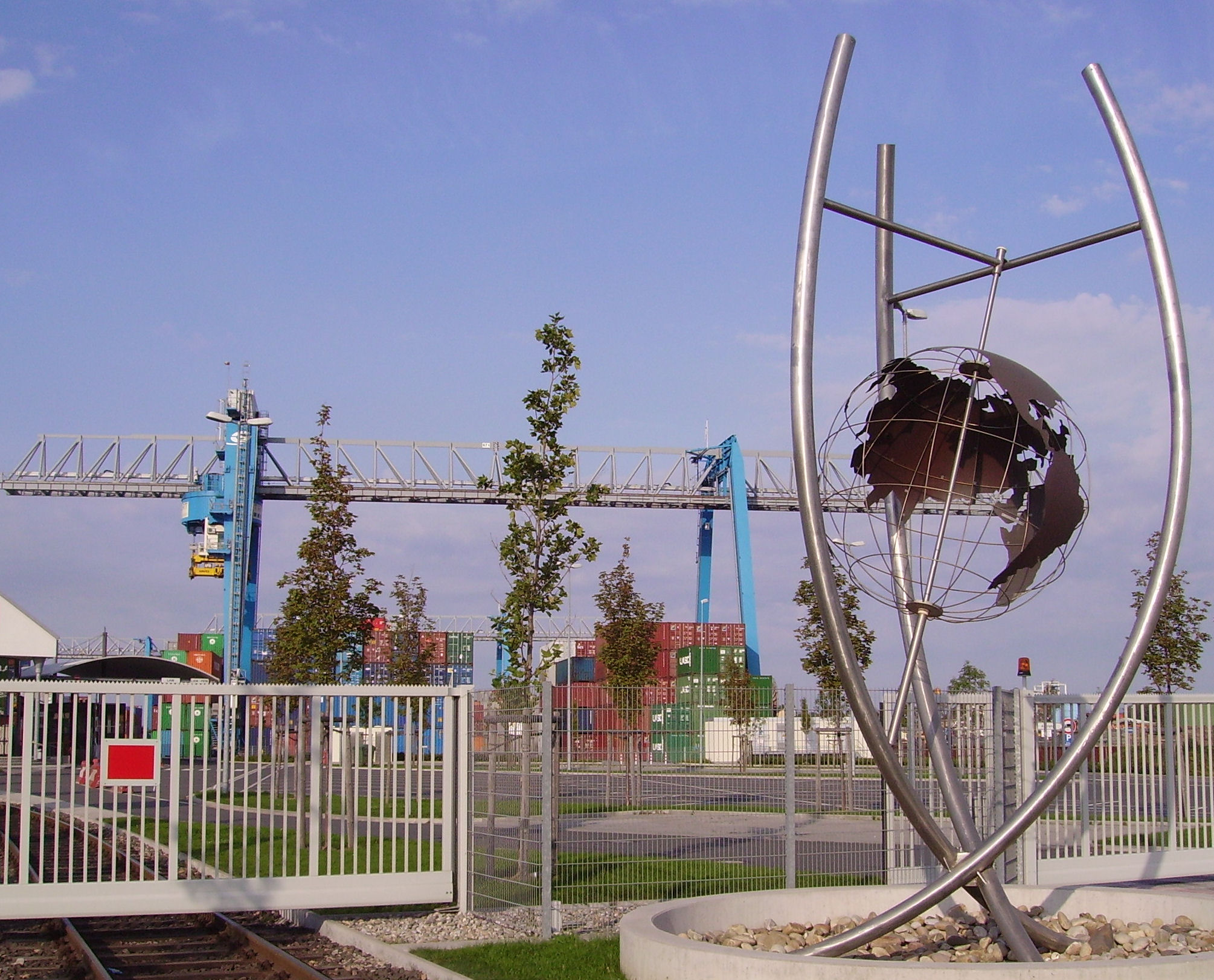
Triport

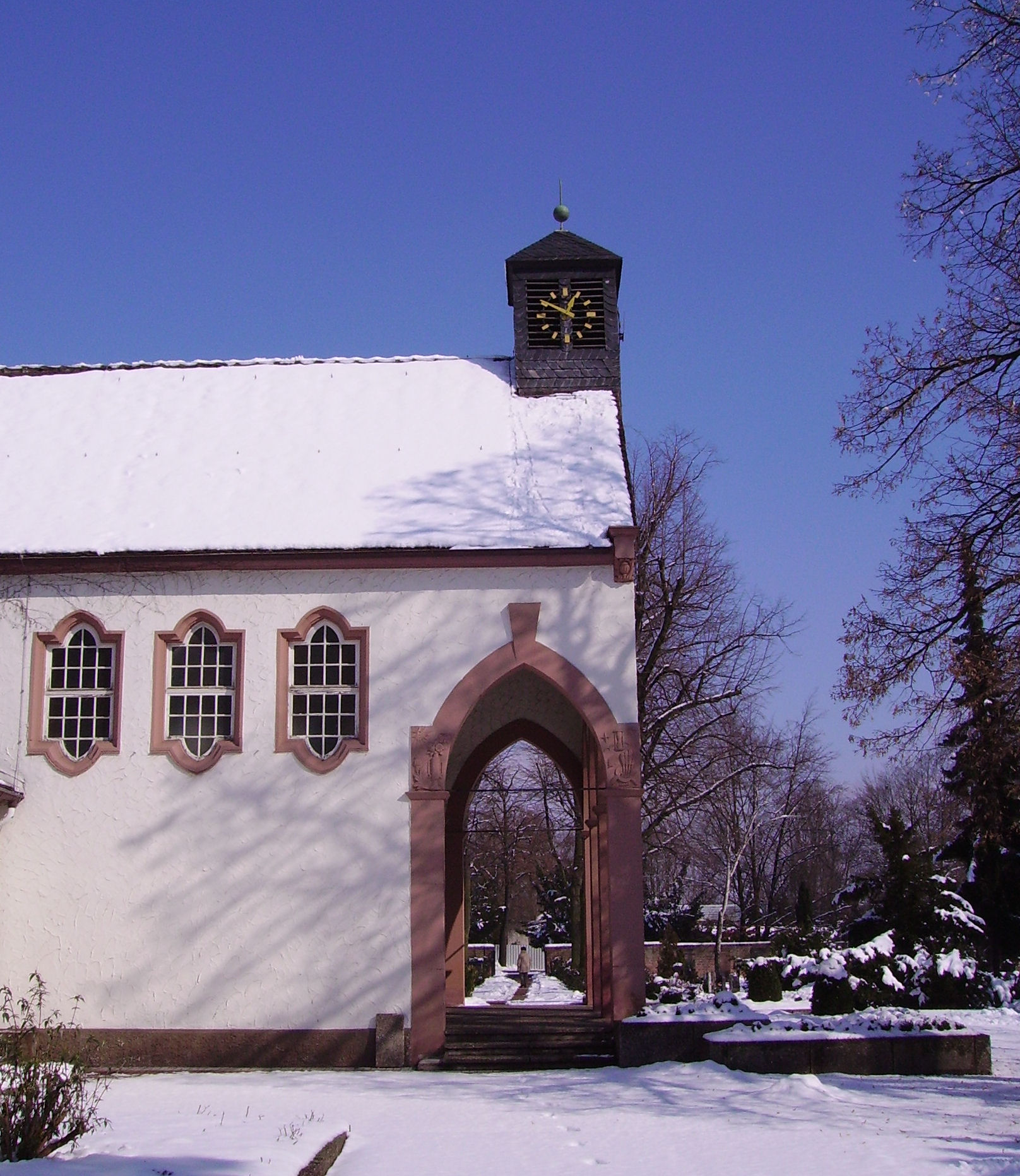
Cemetery chapel

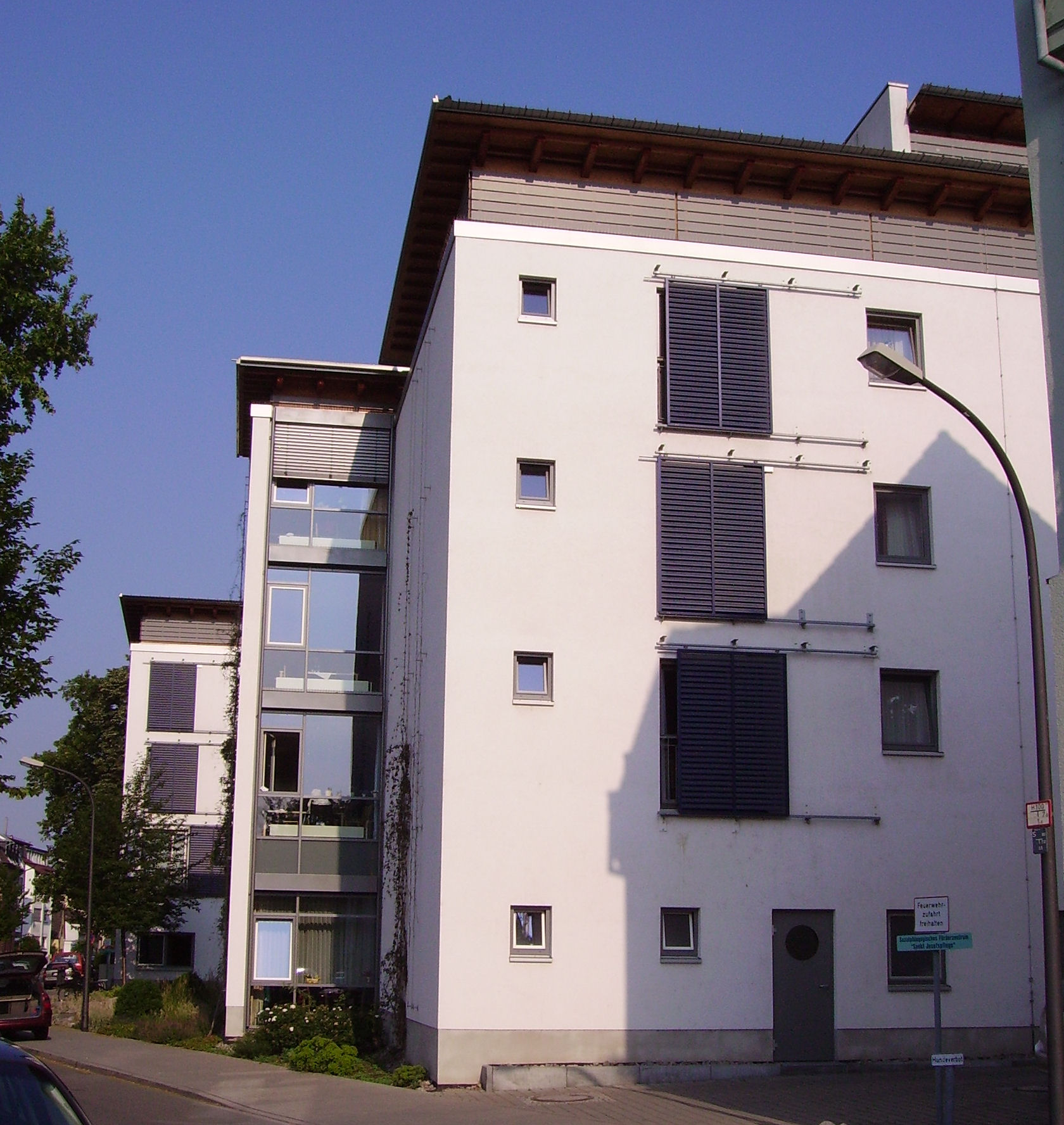
Nursing home

Mundenheim (c. 13,000 inhabitants) is a very old suburb. It boasts its own railway station and an extensive industrial area near the harbour. The Herderviertel is a sub-district in Mundenheim's north.

=== Oggersheim ===
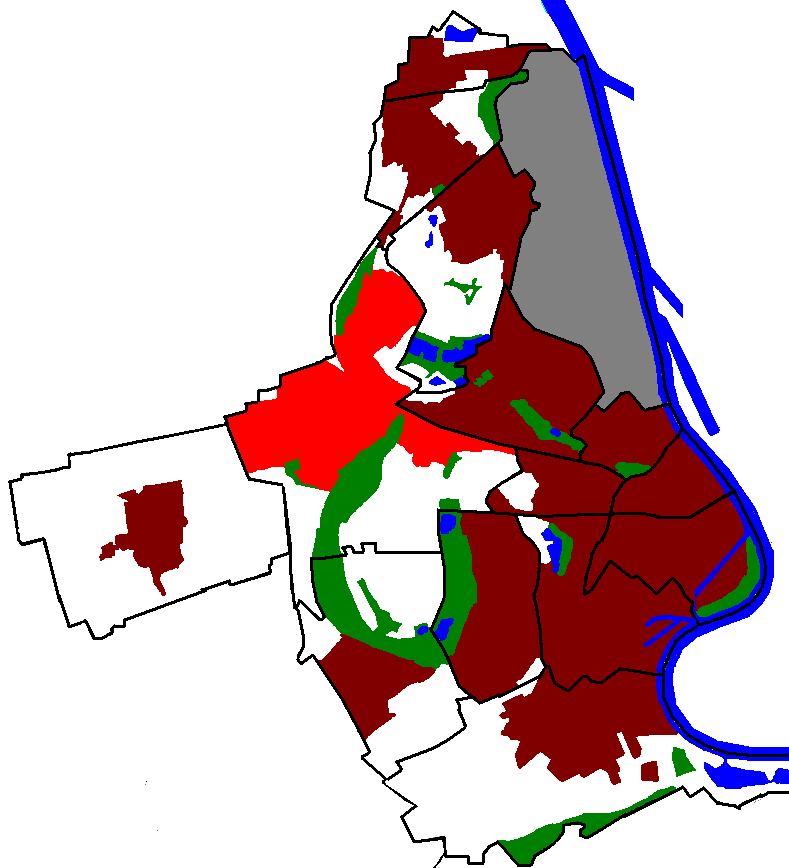
Position

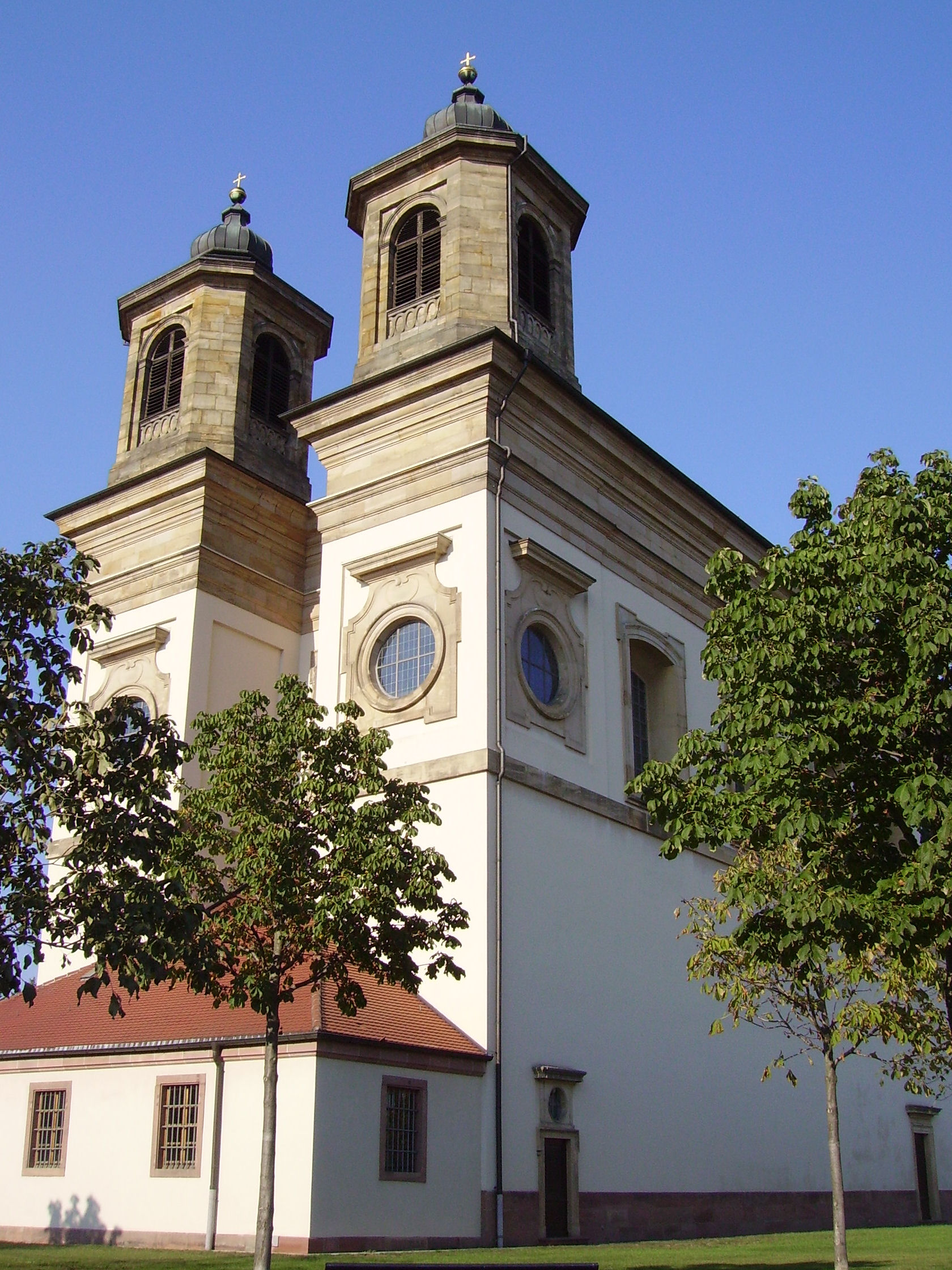
Wallfahrtskirche

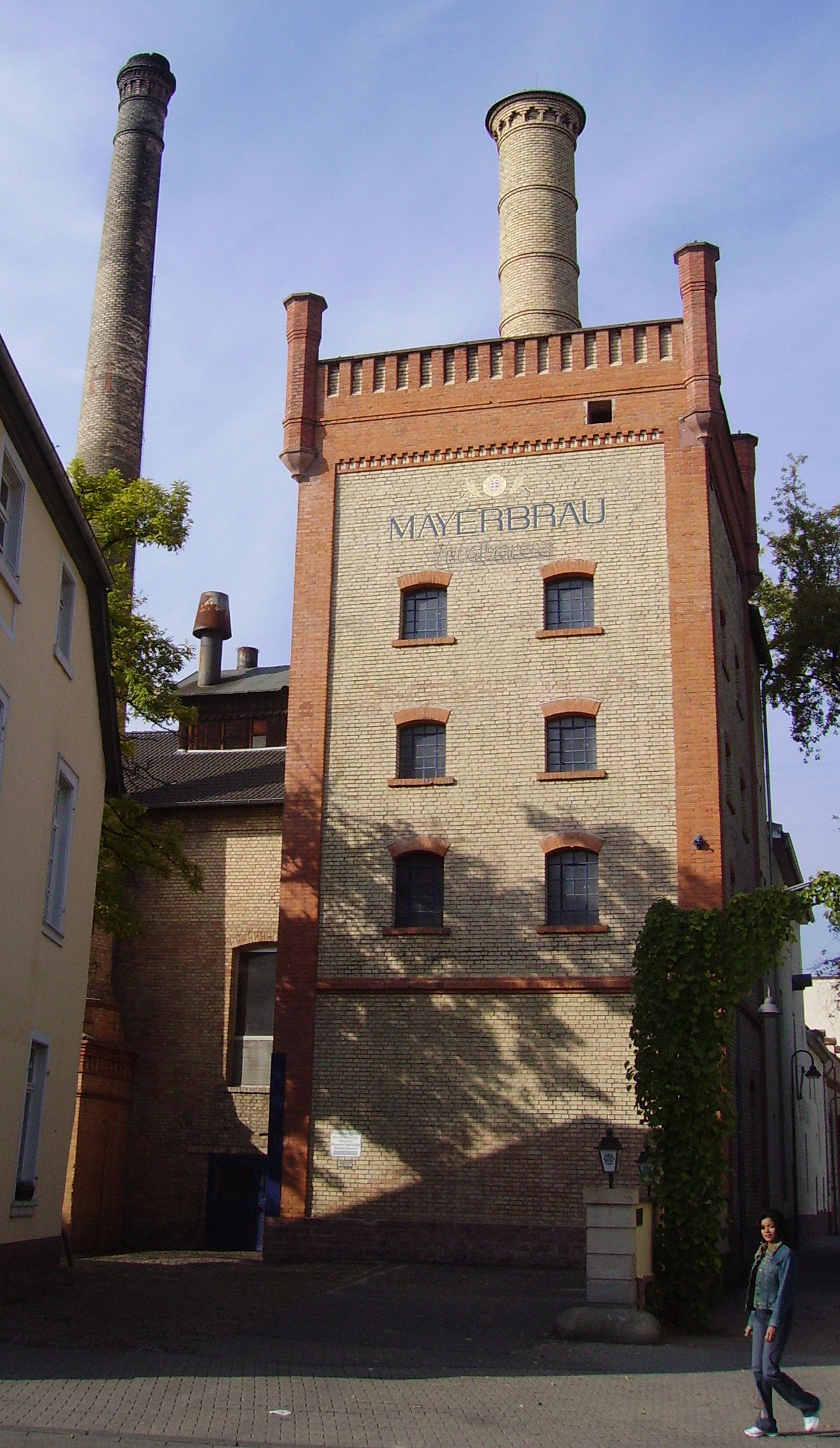
The "Privatbrauerei Gebrüder Mayer" (Meyer Brothers' Private Brewery), founded in 1846 and still operational

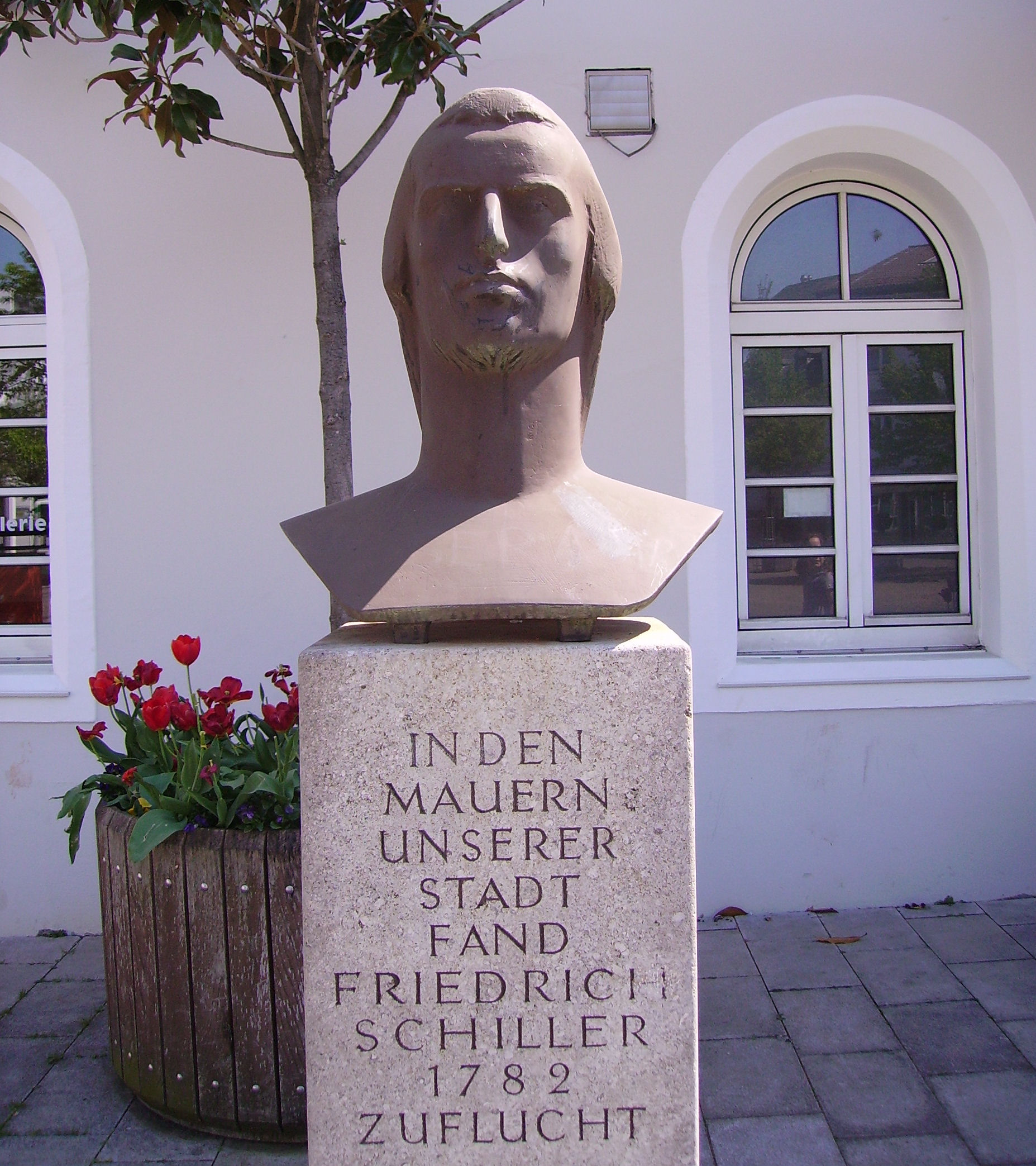
Friedrich Schiller

Oggersheim (c. 23,000 inhabitants) is one of the most important suburbs, having been an independent town in the Middle Ages. It is mentioned in the Wormser wall-building ordinance from around 900 as one of the places that shared responsibility for maintaining the city wall of Worms. During the 18th century, Electress Palatine, Elisabeth Auguste, used Schloss Oggersheim as her summer palace.

Helmut Kohl owned a bungalow in southern Oggersheim. The Wallfahrtskirche, a railway station, the Unfallklinik ("casualty hospital"), and several large residential blocks are to be found in Oggersheim. For the last few years, the northern subdistricts of Notwende and Melm have seen a large amount of building in their new housing estates.

=== Rheingönheim ===
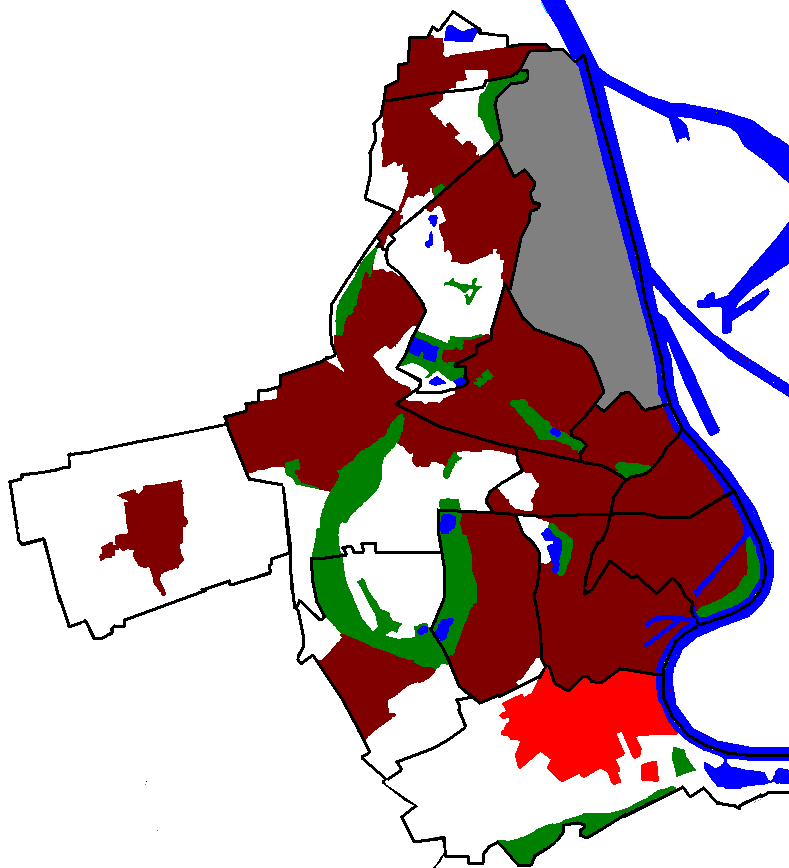
Position

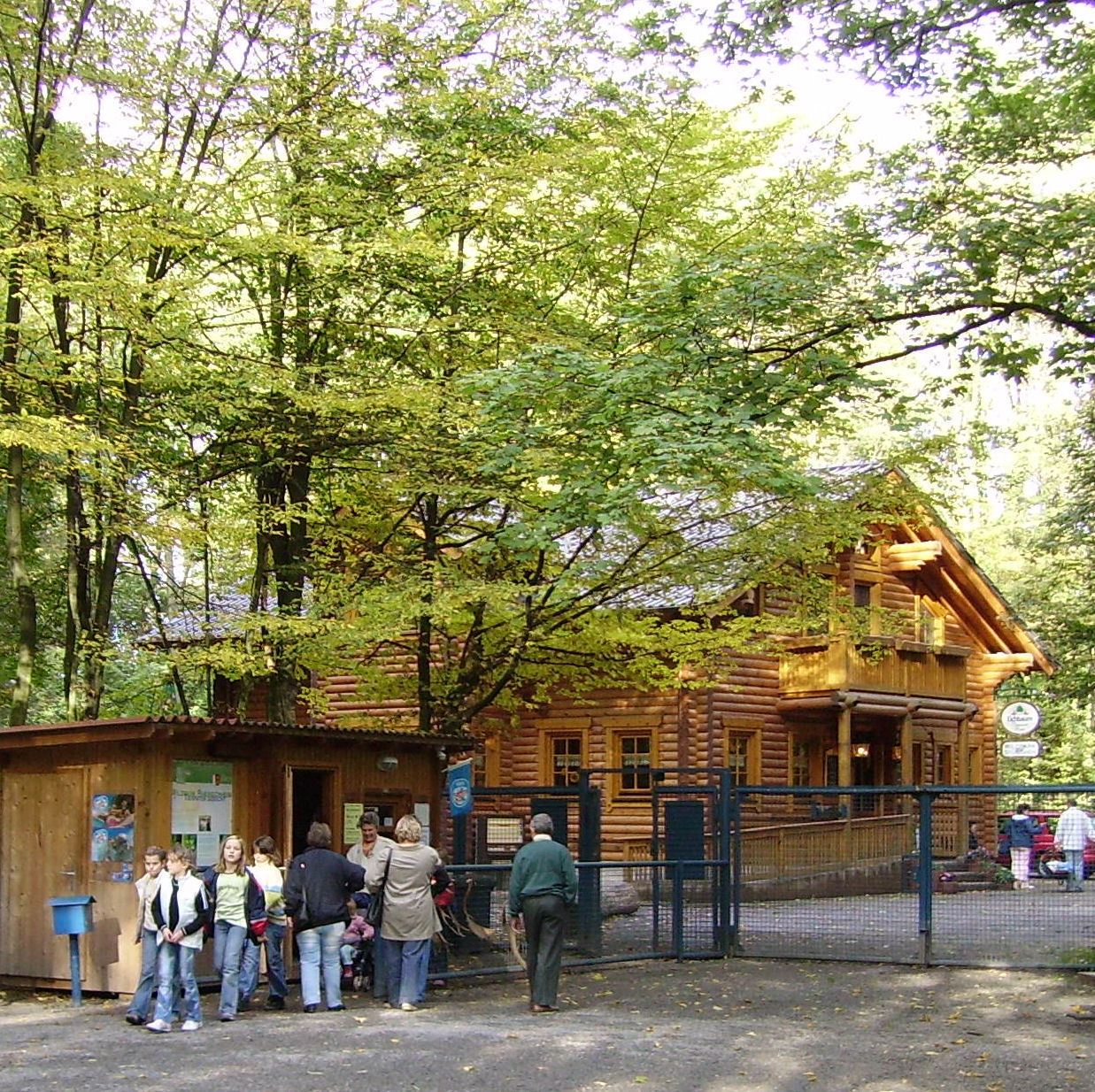
Wildpark

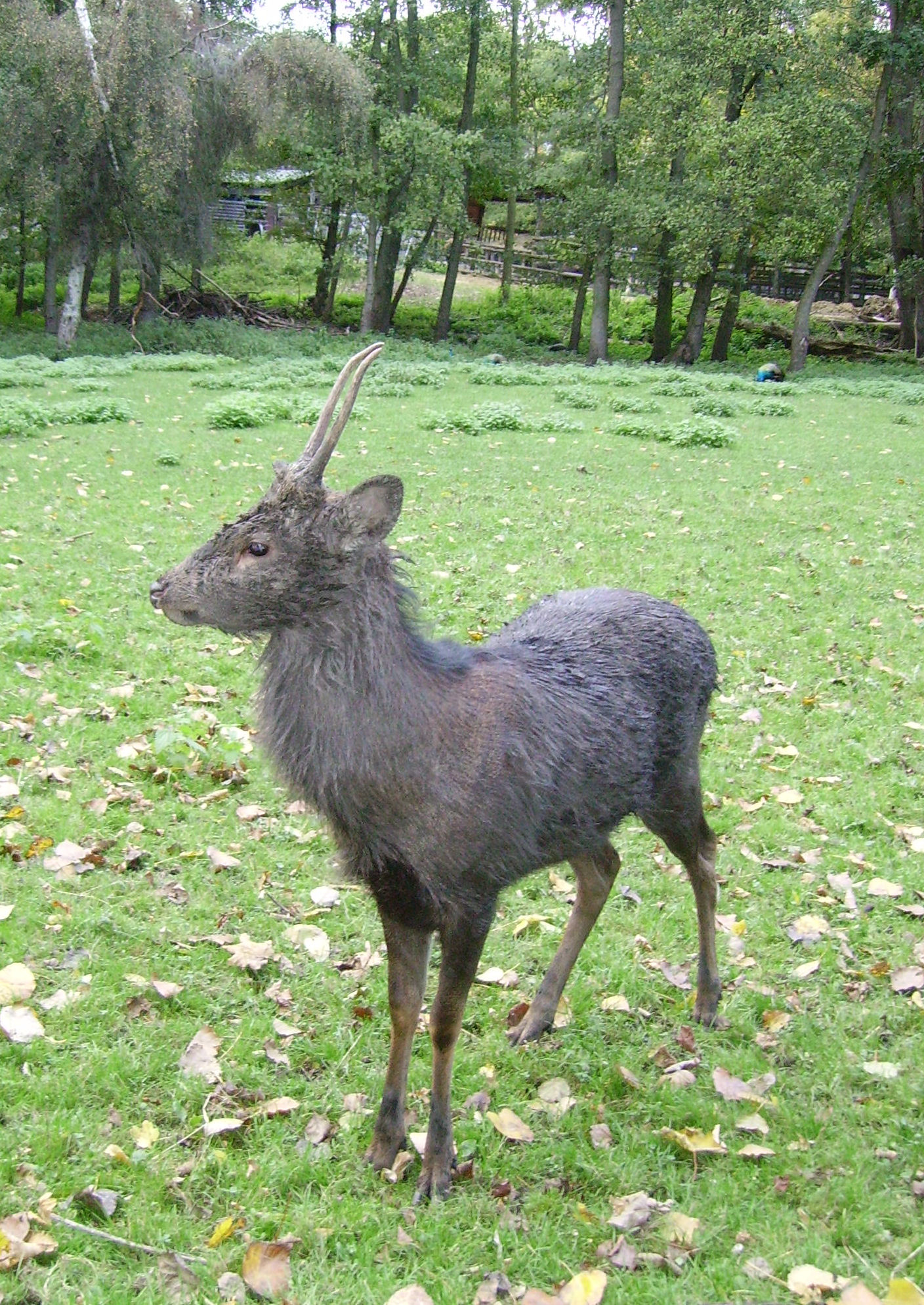
Wildpark

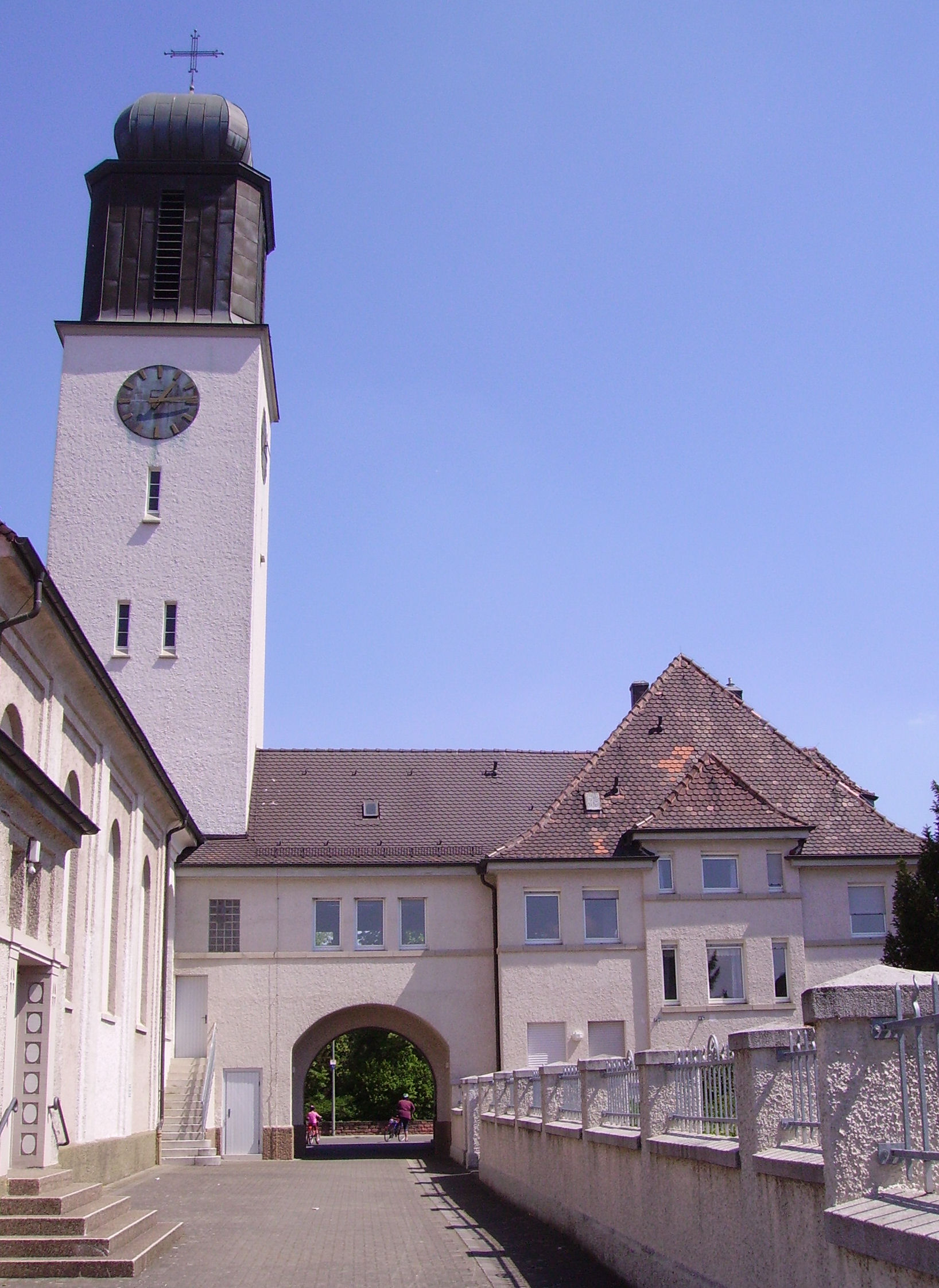
Catholic church

Rheingönheim (c. 7,000 inhabitants) is the southernmost suburb of Ludwigshafen and is known mainly for its industry and Wildpark game enclosure.

=== Maudach ===
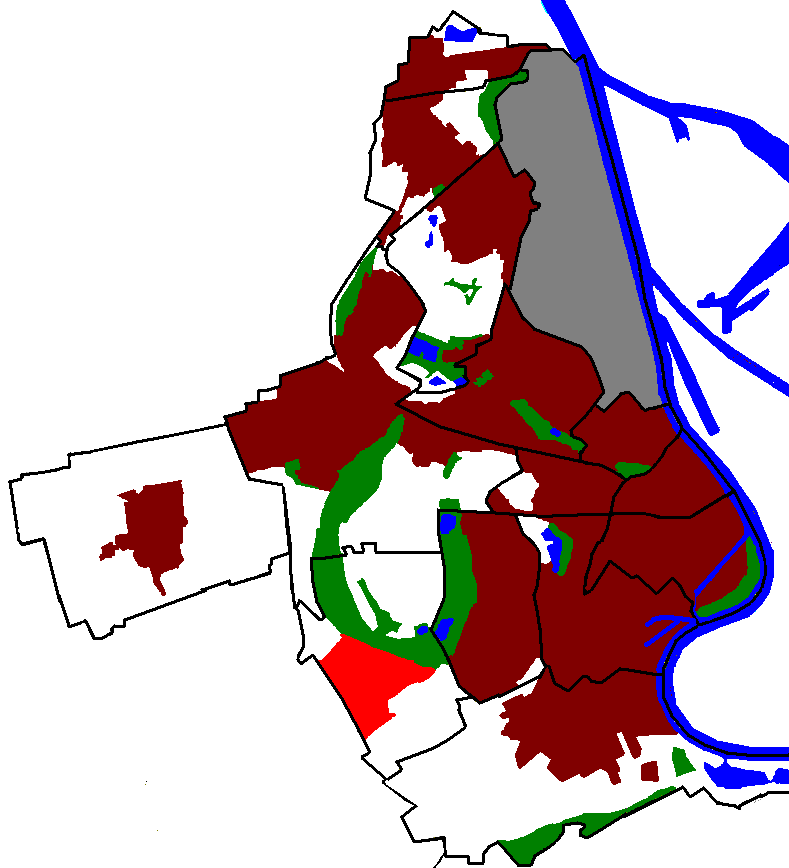
Location

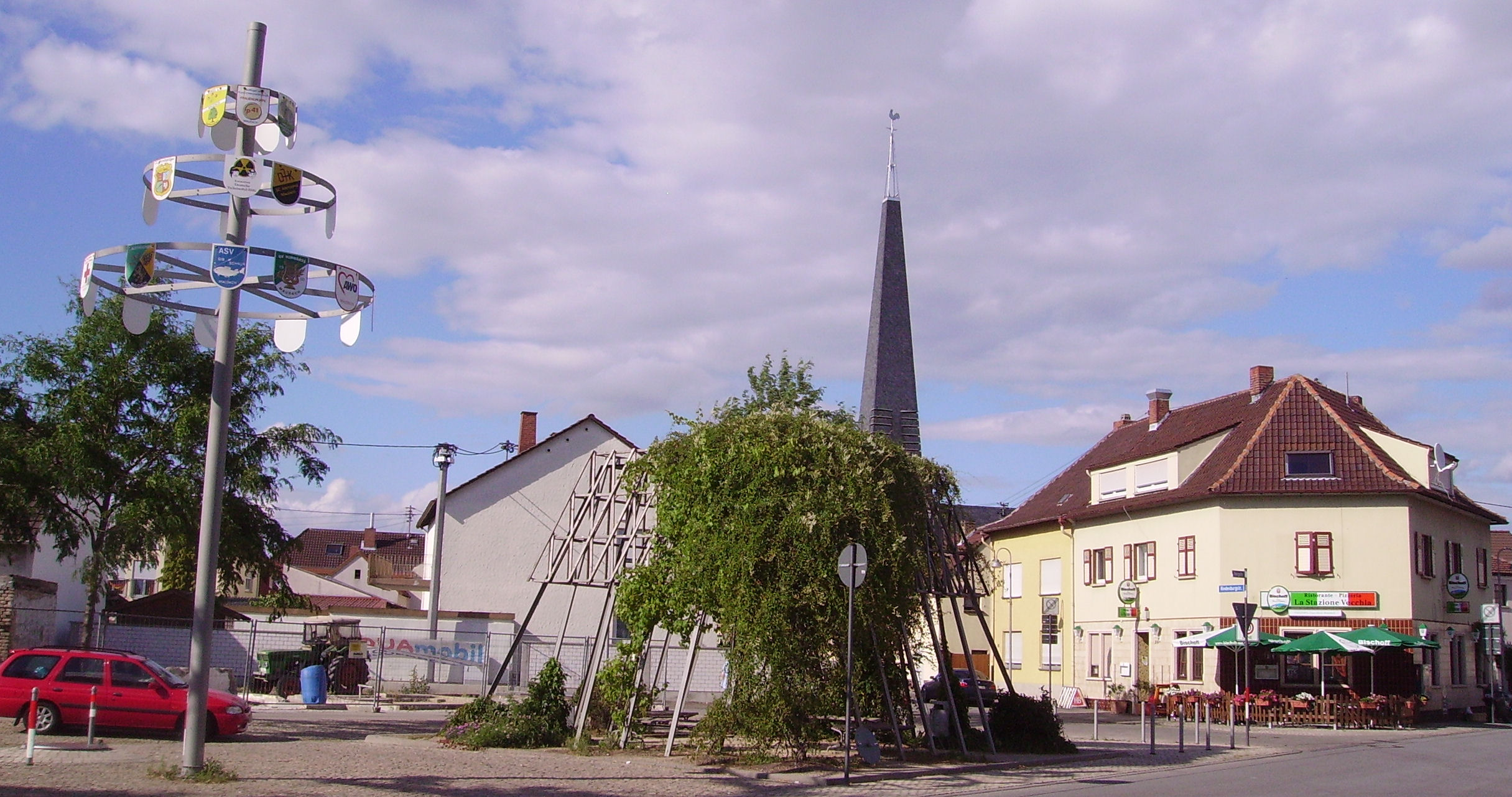
The centre

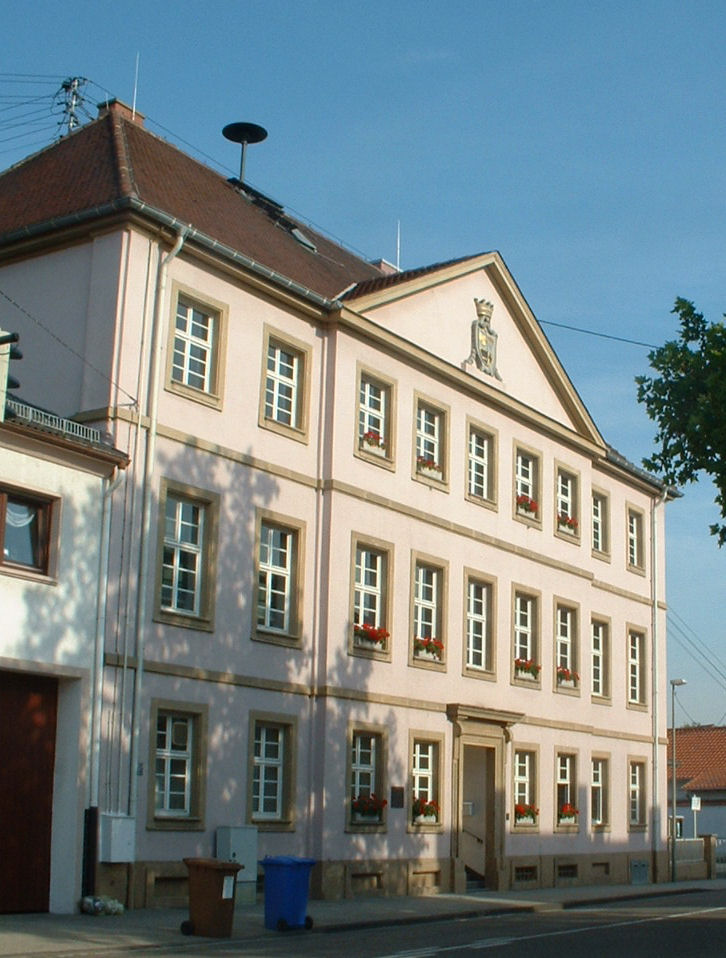
Castle

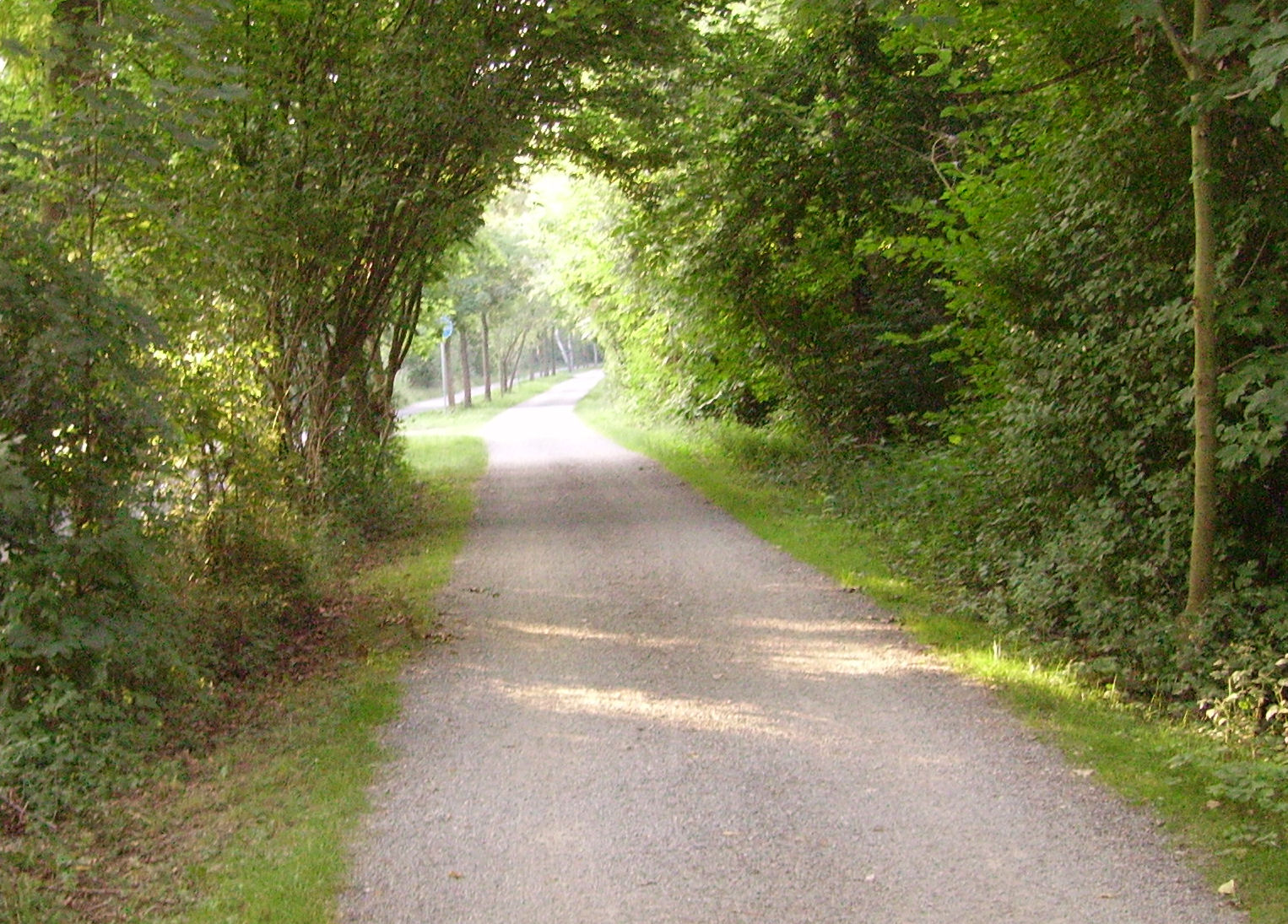
Maudacher Bruch

Maudach (c. 7,000 inhabitants), in Ludwigshafen's south-west, is a popular residential area, closely associated with the Maudacher Bruch park.

=== Ruchheim ===
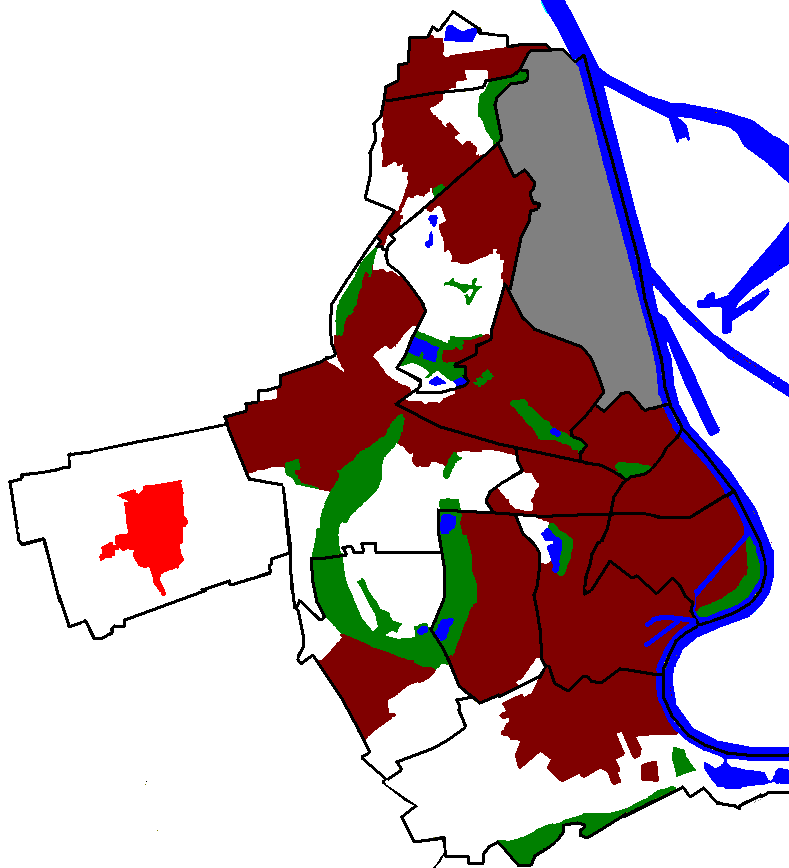
Position

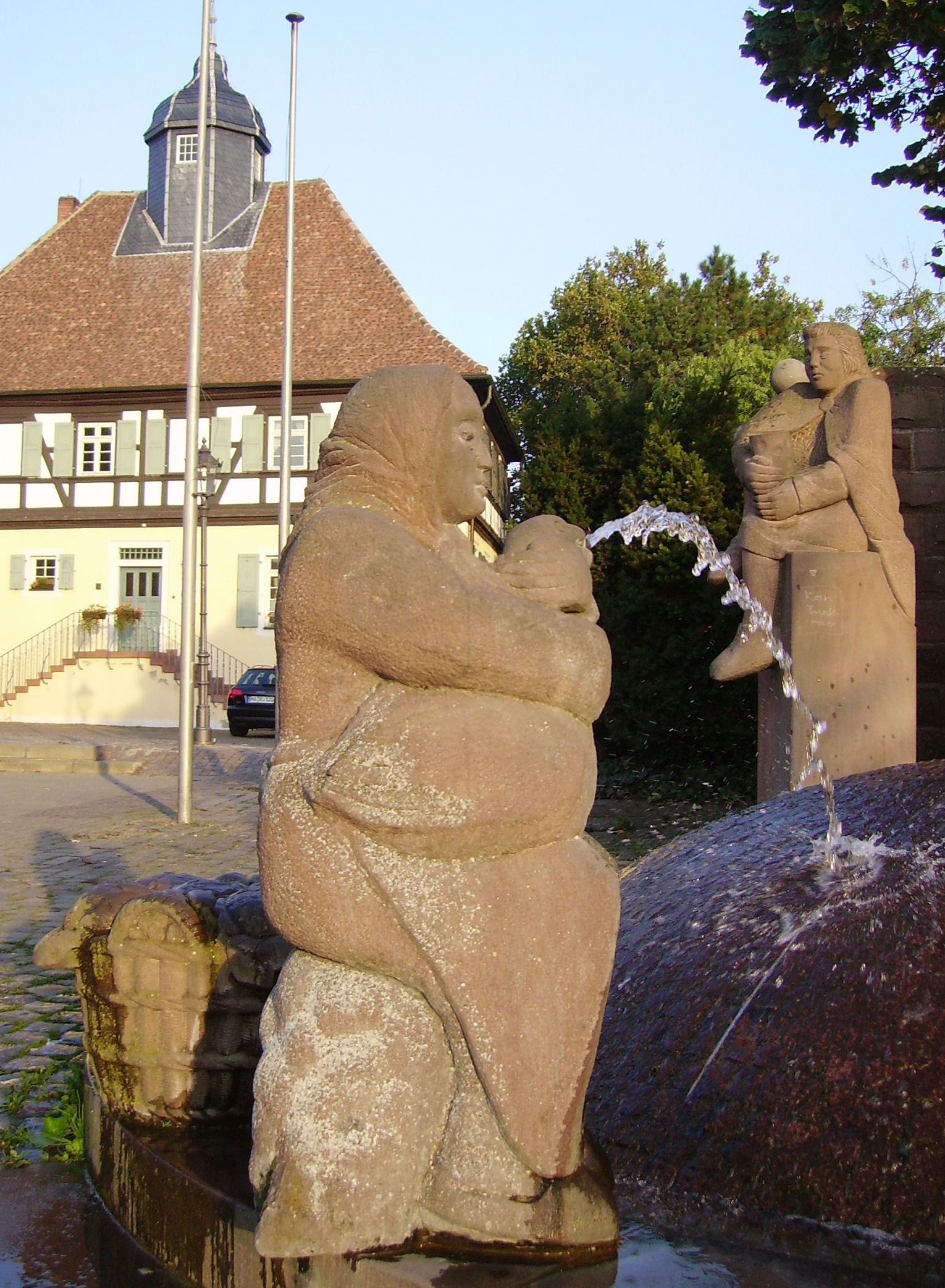
Paul Münch

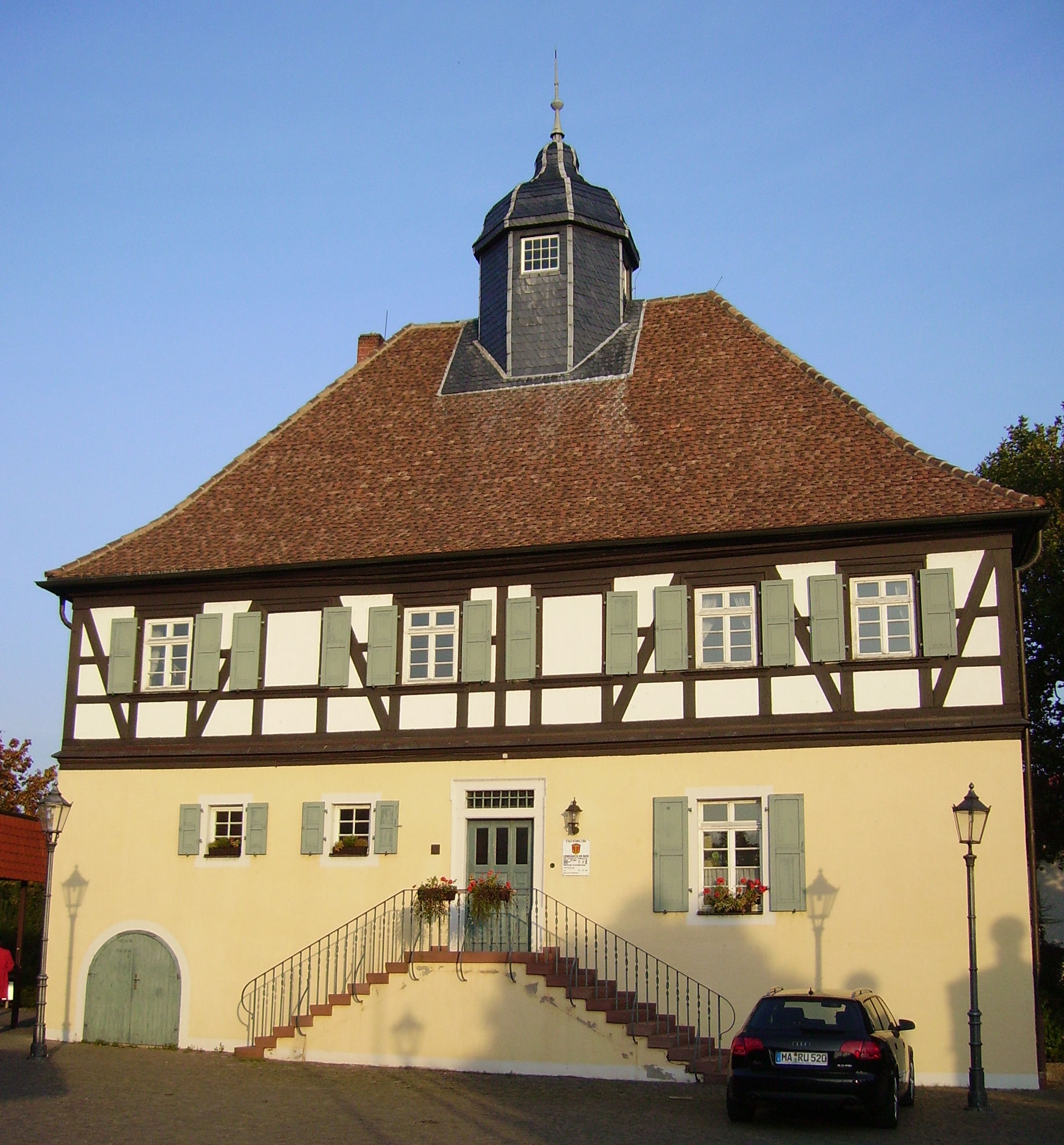
Former townhall

Ruchheim (c. 6,000 inhabitants) is the westernmost suburb and is growing rapidly with new housing estates.

== Transport ==
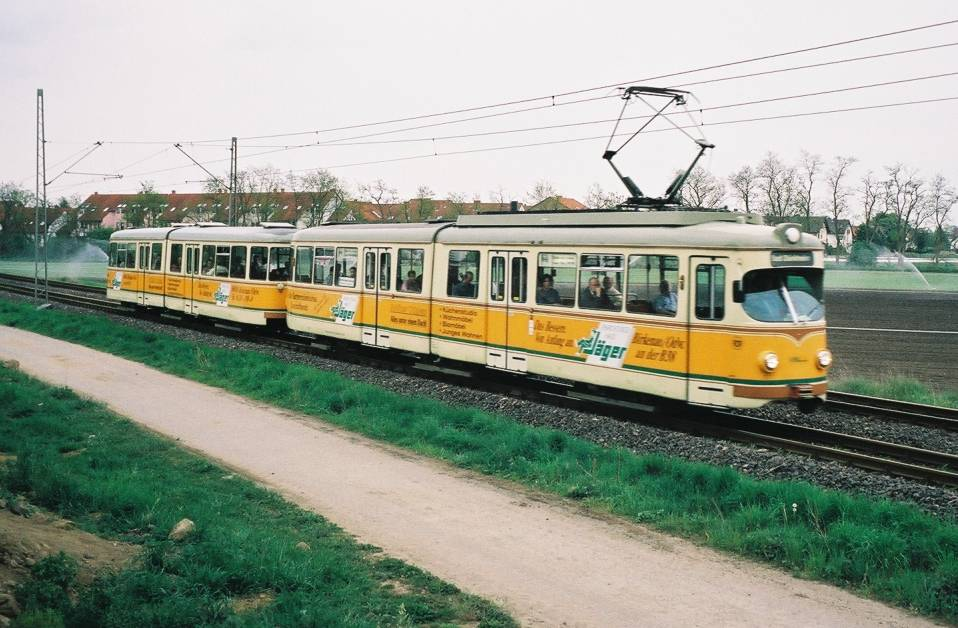
Tramway from the 1960s in regular service

Although Ludwigshafen has no airfield, it is well connected to several airports in the region. There are small airfields near Speyer, Bad Dürkheim and Worms, a medium-sized regional airport in Mannheim, and the Frankfurt International Airport in about an hour's driving distance.

Ludwigshafen is the most important German harbour west of the Rhine. The local industry depends on shipping its raw materials and products on the river. The harbour of Ludwigshafen consists of several basins in the South of the city near Mundenheim (Luitpoldhafen, Kaiserwörthhafen, Mundenheimer Altrheinhafen), the wharves along the river parallel to the city centre and the BASF, and, finally, of the Landeshafen basin in the North that connects the BASF.

Ludwigshafen has excellent Autobahn (motorway/highway) connections in all directions. Most important are the A 650 in west–east direction, the A 61 in north–south direction. But there are also A 6, A 65 and B 9 to be mentioned. Bundesstraße 37 and 44 pass the city centre on elevated expressways. Parts of them are closed because of structural deficiencies. They continue across the Rhine to Mannheim on the Konrad Adenauer Bridge and Kurt Schumacher Bridge.

Ludwigshafen Hauptbahnhof is a huge train station, its impressive pylon bridge pier serving as the city's landmark. The extraordinary architecture of the station complex is caused by the need to connect three joining tracks (to Frankenthal/Worms/Mainz, to Neustadt/Speyer and to Mannheim) and to work in the underground Straßenbahn station and the massive road bridge above the concourse. The station has fallen into disuse due to its remote location and bad layout. The new, more central Ludwigshafen (Rhein) Mitte station, near Berliner Platz, was opened in 2003 and has become the busiest station in Ludwigshafen. Mannheim Hauptbahnhof, one of the most important stations in Germany, is in easy reach of Ludwigshafen's centre, just across the Rhine, and serves as Ludwigshafen's long-distance station. Other railway stations are at Oggersheim, Mundenheim, and Rheingönheim. The S-Bahn Rhein-Neckar suburban train system started operations in 2003; it serves all these stations.

Ludwigshafen's public transport system is run by the VBL (Verkehrsbetriebe Ludwigshafen) and the holding companies Rhein-Neckar-Verkehr (RNV) and VRN. There is an integrated Mannheim/Ludwigshafen tramway network. Lines 4, 4a, 6, 6a, 7, 8, 9, and 10 operate in Ludwigshafen; they all serve Berliner Platz in central Ludwigshafen, adjacent to Ludwigshafen Mitte train station. Except for line 10, which runs through Ludwigshafen only, the lines all cross one of the two Rhine bridges between the two cities. Lines 4, 4a, 6, 8, and 9 also serve Mannheim Hauptbahnhof. Furthermore, there is a cross-country tram link to Bad Dürkheim, used by lines 4, 4a, and 9. The bus network consists of about ten municipal lines and further regional lines.

A rather strange feature of Ludwigshafen's public transport system is the existence of four underground tram stations (Rathaus, Danziger Platz (closed since late 2008), Hauptbahnhof, Hemshofstraße). They go back to the 1970s, when a common underground network in Mannheim and Ludwigshafen was planned. The rash construction of these first stations in Ludwigshafen became superfluous when Mannheim cancelled the project due to its enormous costs.

== Region and neighbours ==
The twin cities of Mannheim and Ludwigshafen closely cooperate in many areas; although they are separated by the Baden-Württemberg/Rhineland Palatinate boundary, this frontier is mainly an administrative one. Many Ludwigshafeners shop and go out in Mannheim's inner city, as it is within easy reach. In the reverse case, some Mannheimers work in Ludwigshafen and many University of Mannheim students choose Ludwigshafen as their residence because of its cheaper rents.

The surroundings of Ludwigshafen on the left bank of the Rhine are called Pfalz and are the easternmost part of the Palatinate region. The administrative district around Ludwigshafen is called Rhein-Pfalz-Kreis. North of Ludwigshafen, there is the industrial town of Frankenthal. In the western vicinity of Ludwigshafen, there are several villages producing enormous amounts of vegetables, thus securing the Rheinpfalz the title of "Germany's vegetable garden". The district south of Ludwigshafen is dominated by the Rhine and the Altrhein arms (lakes marking the earlier course of the river) and the ancient town of Speyer with its magnificent imperial cathedral, a noteworthy and remarkable city.

The regions with some more distance to Ludwigshafen include the German Wine Route region with Germany's biggest coherent winegrowing area and the Palatinate Forest, the biggest coherent forest of Europe 50 kilometres (31 miles) in the West, the French region Alsace and the German Schwarzwald (Black Forest) hills in the South, Heidelberg and the Odenwald hills in the East and the Rhein-Main region with the city of Frankfurt about 100 kilometres (62 miles) in the North.

== Culture ==
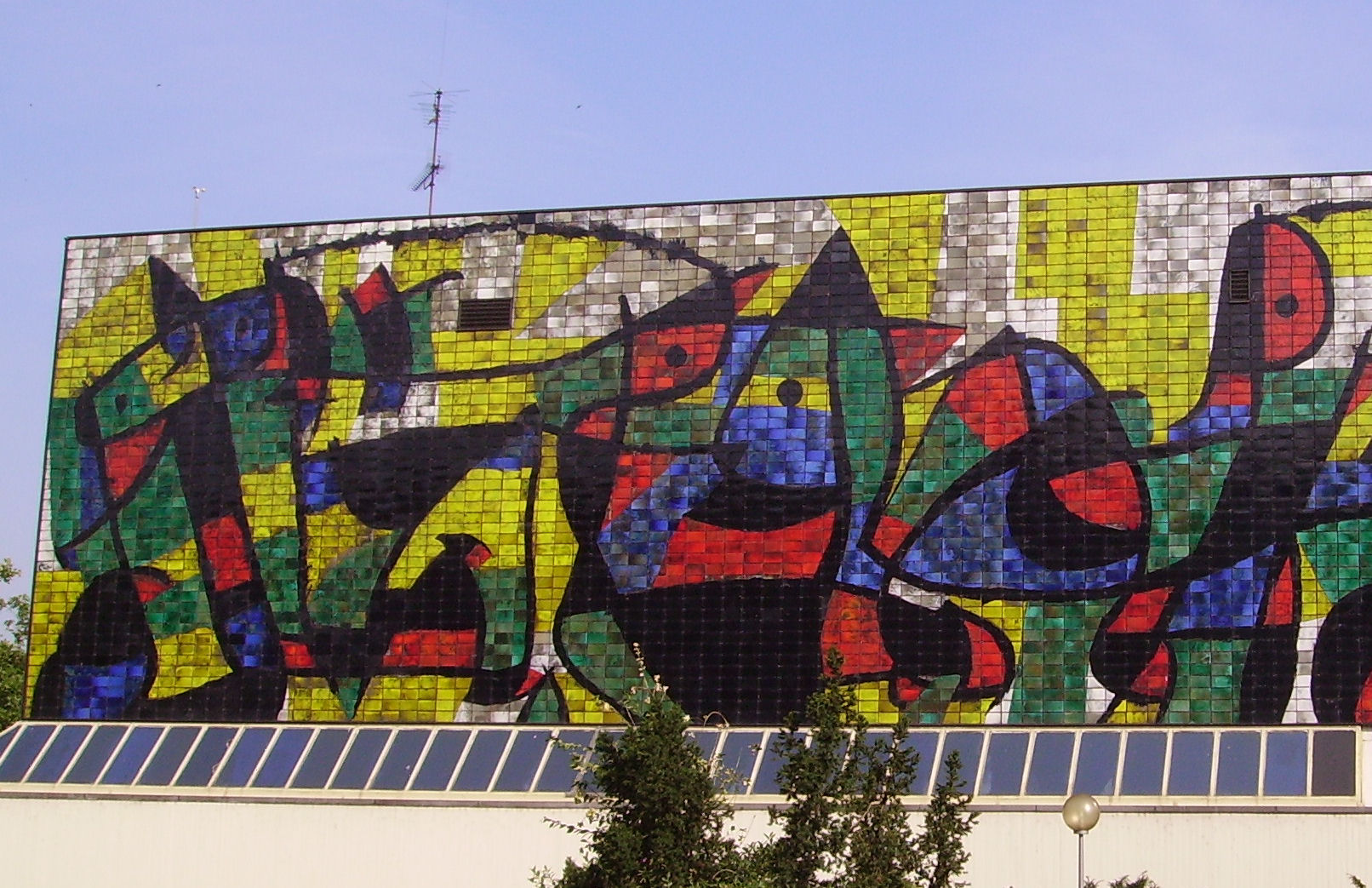
Miró mural, known as the Miró-Wand, on the Wilhelm-Hack-Museum

The Pfalzbau is a theatre and concert hall with regional importance. The Staatsphilharmonie Rheinland-Pfalz keeps its own symphonic orchestra, and there is a production company that stages operas 25 nights per year. In the Hemshof district, there are smaller theatres playing regional dialect plays.

The Wilhelm-Hack-Museum is the municipal art museum, with collections spanning from ancient to contemporary art. It is known for the emblematic Miró mural covering an entire façade, called the "Miró Wall" (Miró-Wand in German). The mural is a work of art by the Spanish artist Joan Miró, with the collaboration of his long-time colleague, the ceramist Joan Gardy Artigas, and is made of 7,200 ceramic tiles. It has been subject to degradation due to air pollution since it was installed in 1979.

Several small museums in Ludwigshafen focus on the city's history, first of all the Stadtmuseum in the Rathaus Center, but also the Schillerhaus Oggersheim, K.O. Braun-Museum in Oppau or the Frankenthaler Kanal Museum in the North.

The Fachhochschule Ludwigshafen (technical college) specialises in economics and has an affiliated Ostasieninstitut (East Asia Institute). There is also the Evangelische Fachhochschule Ludwigshafen, specialising in social sciences.

== Economy ==
Ludwigshafen production site

Although BASF is by far the most important industrial company in Ludwigshafen, there are many other firms. Trade and industry in Ludwigshafen have about 90,000 employees in total, with an annual total turnover of nearly 17 billion euros.

BASF is the world's leading chemical company, employing 110,000 people in total and about 35,000 (a few years ago, the employee total was about 55,000) of them in the Ludwigshafen plant, which is also the largest chemical plant in the world. The company's main products are fertilizers, dyes, coolants and many other chemical substances. Among the other chemical companies with plants in Ludwigshafen are BK Giulini, AbbVie, Raschig and Benckiser. Other important branches of industry are mechanical engineering, electrical engineering, IT and brewery (Mayerbräu Oggersheim).

== Sports ==
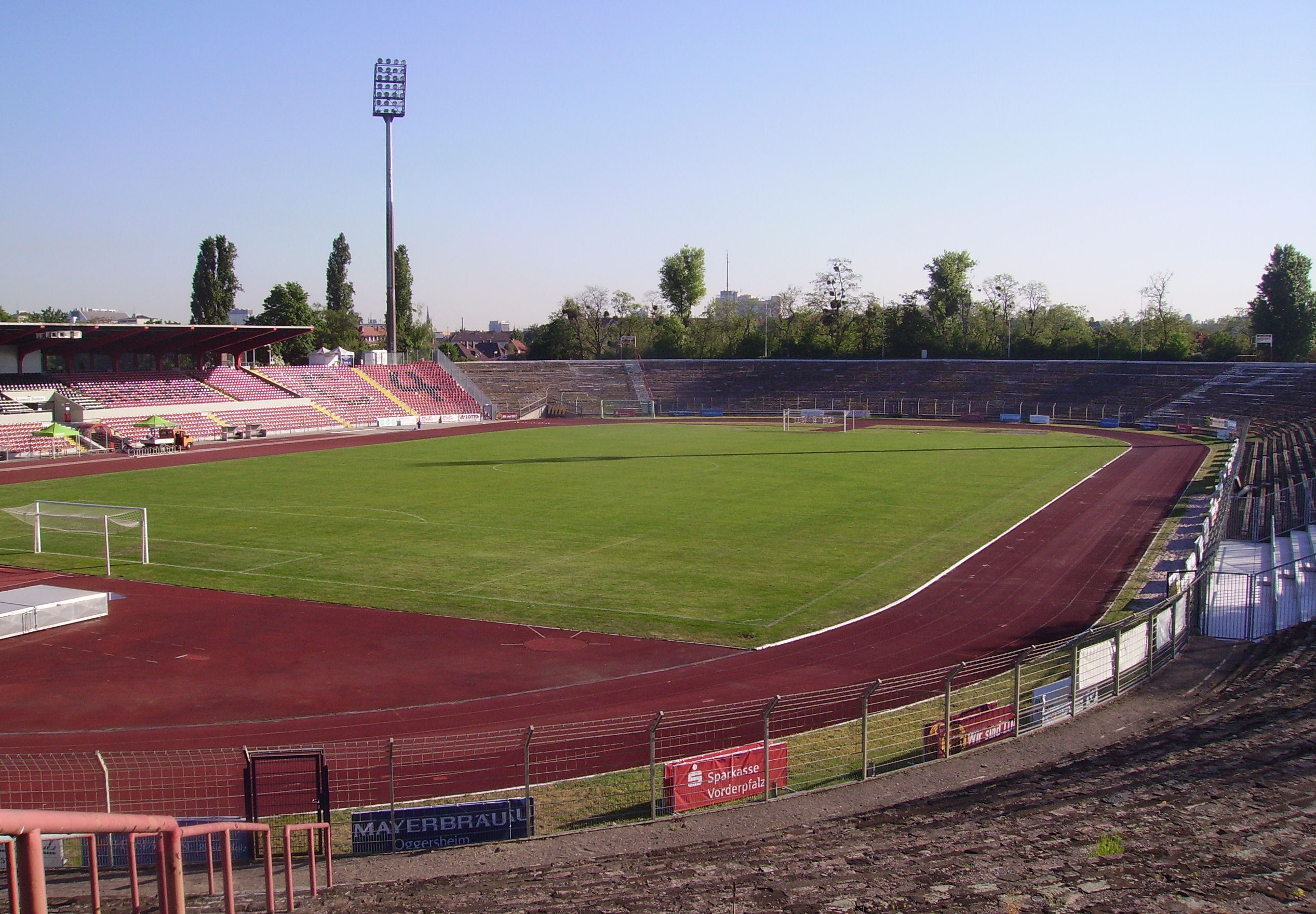
Südweststadion

Ludwigshafen is one of the German cities that has never had a professional football club. Ludwigshafen has quite a large stadium, the Südweststadion, built from debris from World War II, with a capacity of around 40,000. Several international matches and some Bundesliga matches when 1. FC Kaiserslautern or Waldhof Mannheim used it as an alternative stadium during the past decades, where matches have been held.

Huddersfield Town left-back Dominik Werling was born in Ludwigshafen.

Formerly, the most successful Ludwigshafen football club was FSV Oggersheim, whose team experienced short-term success when gaining promotion to the Regionalliga (3rd Division) at the end of the 2006–07 season. However, the club found itself outclassed, and as the financial situation grew worse after two poor seasons, the club withdrew to 11th tier local level play in 2010–11.

As of 2015, Arminia Ludwigshafen is the highest-classed football club from the city, competing in the Oberliga Rheinland-Pfalz/Saar (V).

An athletics hall was constructed near the Stadium a few years ago. The TSG Friesenheim has played in the German 1st handball division since the summer of 2010.

== Nature ==
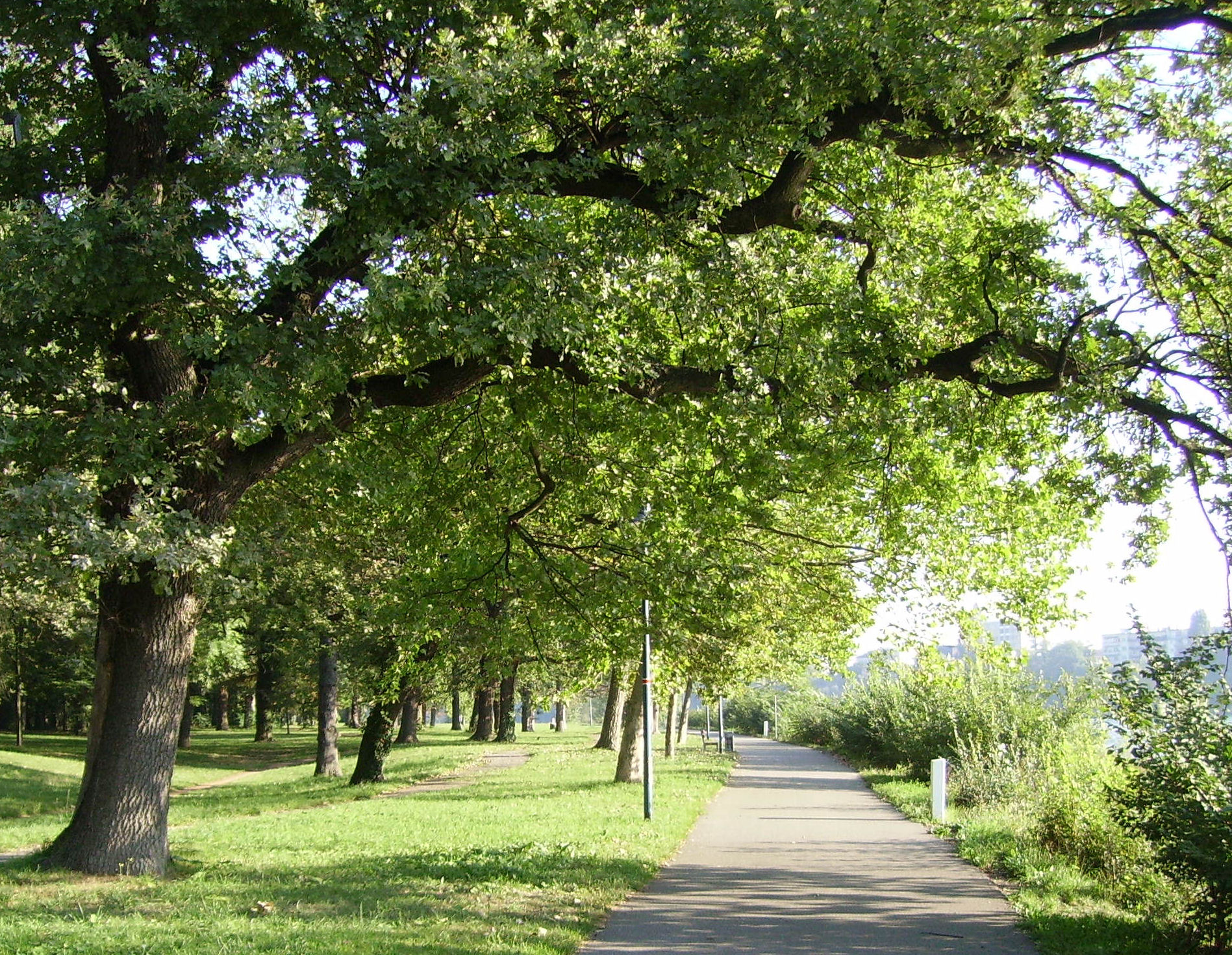
Parkinsel

There are several municipal parks in Ludwigshafen: First of all, the Ebertpark in the North quarter and Friesenheim. It was created for the South German Horticulture Exhibition in 1925 with the Friedrich-Ebert-Halle, a multi-purpose hall.

The official Stadtpark, or municipal park, is somewhat remote from the city centre (yet easy to reach by the #10 tram), because it is situated on the Parkinsel, or park island, on a bank of the Rhine.

The Friedenspark is closer to the city centre, being located just north of the main station and west of the city hall. It is the youngest of Ludwigshafen's parks, having been created on a former industrial area.

Further, there are numerous smaller parks that are just a bit larger than a towel in the suburbs, for example, the Stadtpark Oggersheim, Riedsaumpark, Alwin-Mittasch-Platz and Friesenpark in Friesenheim, Stadtpark Oppau, Bürgerpark Pfingstweide or Zedtwitzpark Mundenheim.

The Maudacher Bruch in the West between Maudach, Gartenstadt and Oggersheim, is a very extensive, horse-shoe shaped area, including the Michaelsberg (126 m), a mountain built of debris and wreckage after World War II. Due to excessive extraction of ground water from chemical companies the ground water level drops and the diversity of nature is no longer preserved. The Kief'scher Weiher in the South is connected with the Rhine and serves as yacht harbour, being surrounded by weekend camping areas.

== Notable people ==
=== 19th century ===
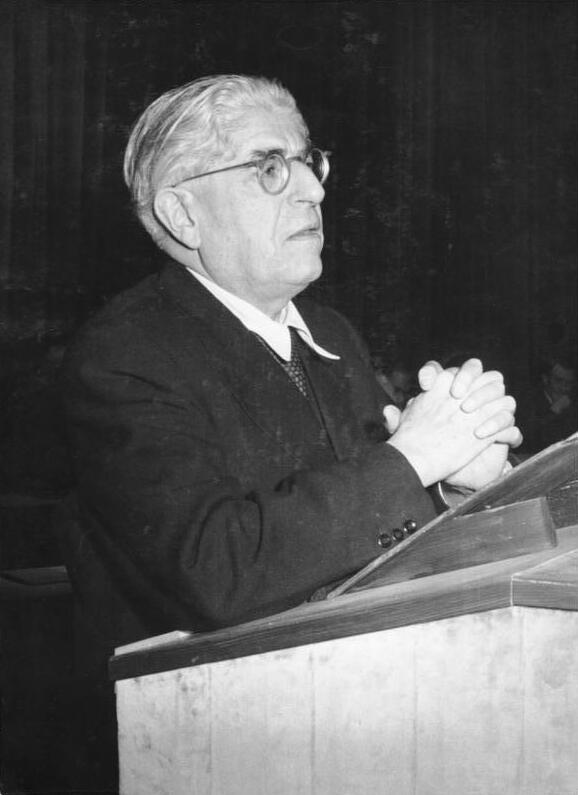
Ernst Bloch, Berlin, 1954

- Ernst Bloch (1885–1977), philosopher and writer
- Ernst A. Lehmann (1886–1937), airship captain and Zeppelin builder
- William Dieterle (1893–1972), Hollywood film director, actor and Oscar-winner
- Edgar Julius Jung (1894–1934), lawyer, politician and journalist
- Gustav Ehrhart (1894–1971), chemist

=== 20th century ===
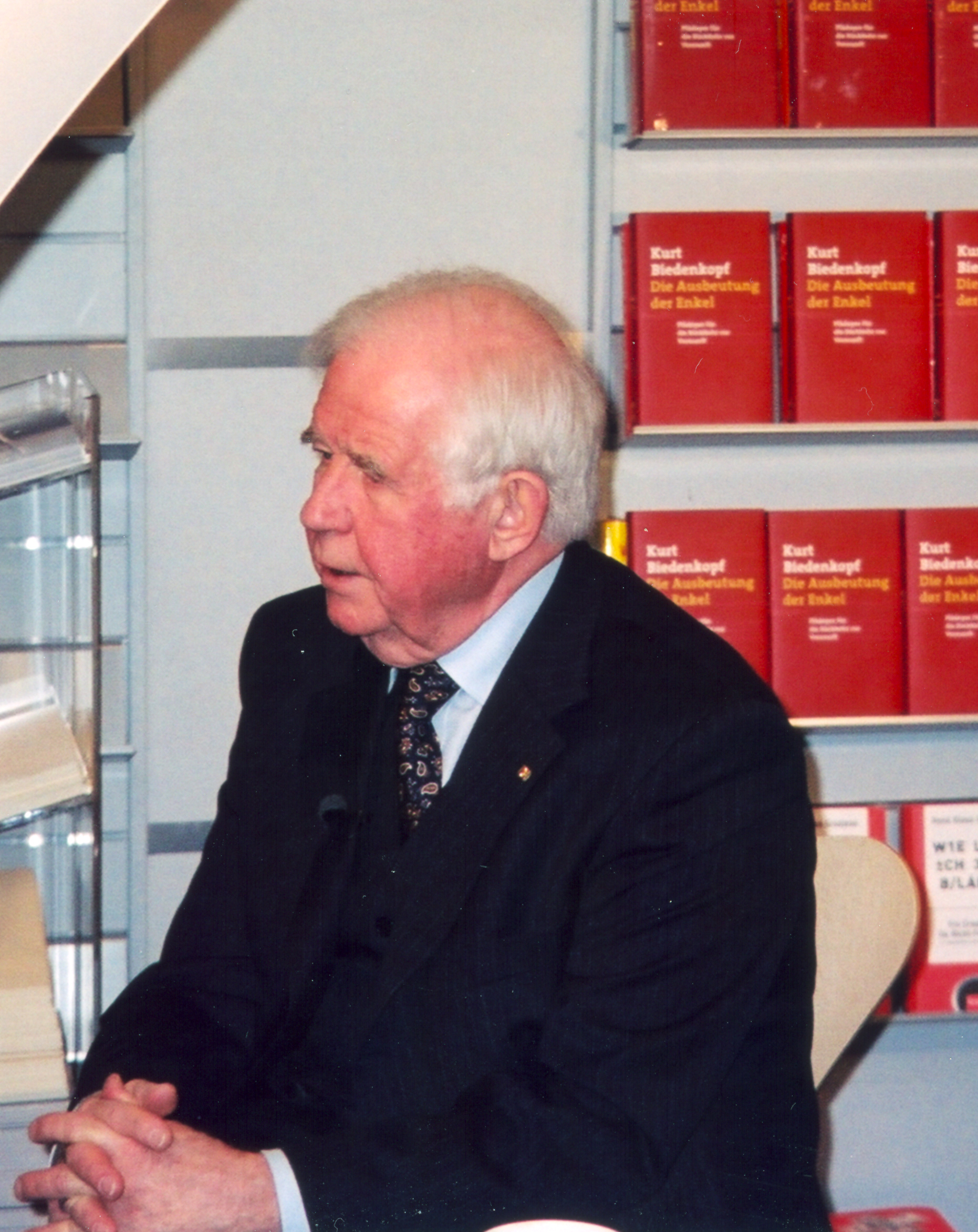
Kurt Biedenkopf, Leipzig, 2006

==== 1901–1940 ====
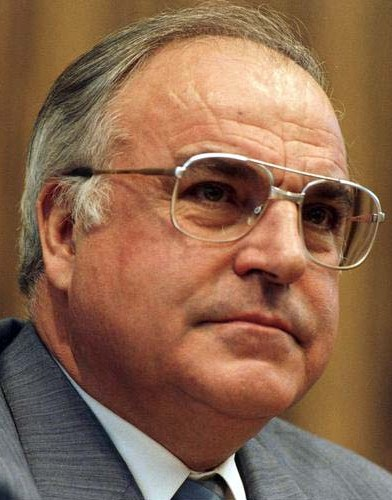
Helmut Kohl, former Chancellor of Germany

- Georg Gehring (1903–1943), wrestler, Olympic bronze medalist
- Oswald Karch (1917–2009), German racing driver
- Ernst Gutting (1919–2013), auxiliary bishop of Speyer
- Klaus Gamber (1919–1989), Catholic priest and liturgical historian
- Max Clos (1925–2002), French journalist
- Rudolf Kortokraks (1928–2014), painter
- Carl Haas (1929–2016), American racing driver
- Waldemar Schreckenberger (1929–2017), lawyer, professor emeritus and secretary of state and head of the Bundeskanzleramt 1982–1984
- Helmut Kohl (1930–2017), German chancellor (1982–1998)
- Kurt Biedenkopf (1930–2021), politician (CDU), former Ministerpräsident of Saxony (1990–2002)
- Robert Franz Schmidt (1932–2017), physiologist and professor emeritus
- Klaus Grohe (born 1934), German chemist
- Fanny Morweiser (1940–2014), author
- Lambert Hamel (1940–2026), actor and voice actor

==== 1950–1990 ====
- Walter Frosch (1950–2013), football player
- Manfred Kaltz (born 1953), football player and manager
- Norbert Bolz (born 1953), media scientist
- Doris Barnett (born 1953), politician (SPD), Member of Bundestag since 1994
- Wolfgang Güllich (1960–1992), rock climber
- Edgar Naujok (born 1960), politician
- Barbara Eligmann (born 1963), television presenter
- Claudio Passarelli (born 1965), wrestler and champion
- Joachim Weickert (born 1965), mathematician
- Mario Kordić (born 1972), politician (HDZ BiH), mayor of Mostar
- Sanne Kurz (born 1974), camera woman
- Richard Möller (born 1977), football player and manager
- Jan-Peter Peckolt (born 1981), sailor (49er dinghy)
- Boris Brejcha (born 1981), DJ and record producer
- André Schürrle (born 1990), footballer
- Christian Dissinger (born 1991), handball player
- Paul Ehmann (born 1993), footballer
- Nadiem Amiri (born 1996), footballer
- Apache 207 (born 1997), rapper

== Twin towns – sister cities ==
Ludwigshafen is twinned with:

- Pasadena, United States (1948)
- Lorient, France (1963)
- Romford (Essex), United Kingdom (1971)
- Sumqayit, Azerbaijan (1977)
- Dessau-Roßlau, Germany (1988)
- Antwerp, Belgium (1999)
- Gaziantep, Turkey (2012)
- Zviahel, Ukraine (2022)
