= Princess Feodora Adelheid of Schleswig-Holstein-Sonderburg-Augustenburg =

German painter (1874–1910)

Princess Feodora
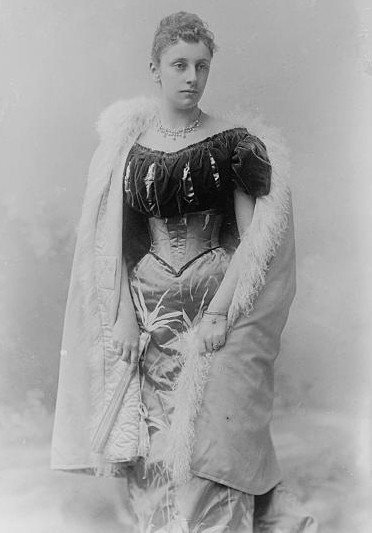
- Feodora in 1892/1893
- Born: 3 July 1874; Przemków
- Died: 21 June 1910 (aged 35); Obersasbach, Germany
- Burial: Primkenau Castle, Lower Silesia
- House: Schleswig-Holstein-Sonderburg-Augustenburg
- Father: Frederick VIII, Duke of Schleswig-Holstein
- Mother: Princess Adelheid of Hohenlohe-Langenburg

Princess Feodora Adelheid of Schleswig-Holstein-Sonderburg-Augustenburg (Feodora Adelheid Helene Louise Caroline Pauline Alice Jenny; 3 July 1874 – 21 June 1910) was a member of the House of Schleswig-Holstein-Sonderburg-Augustenburg and was the daughter of Frederick VIII, Duke of Schleswig-Holstein.

== Life and work ==
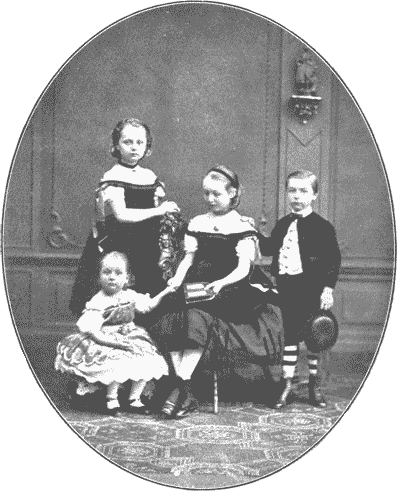
from left to right: Louise Sophie (standing), Feodora, Augusta Victoria and Ernst Günther, around 1876

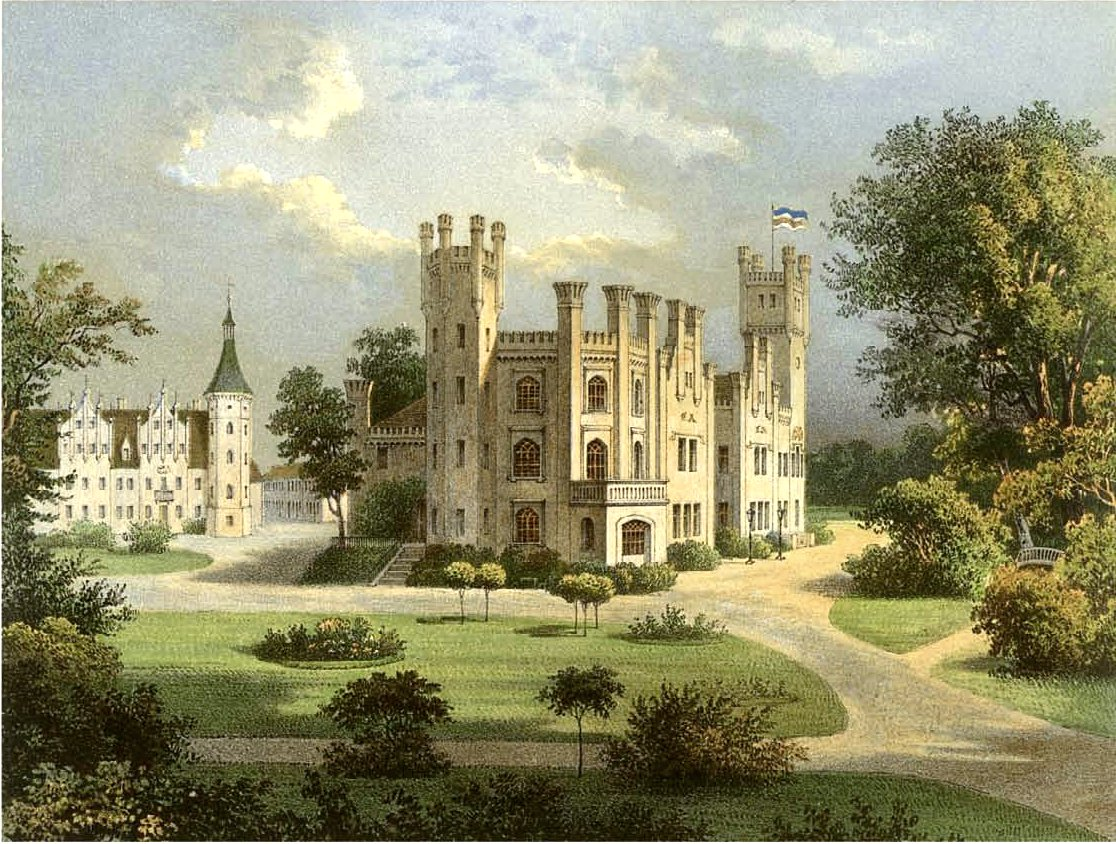
Primkenau Castle around 1860, Collection Alexander Duncker

Princess Feodora was the youngest daughter of seven children of the (titular) Duke Frederick VIII, Duke of Schleswig-Holstein (1829–1880) and his wife Princess Adelheid of Hohenlohe-Langenburg (1835–1900), second daughter of Ernst I, Prince of Hohenlohe-Langenburg and the Princess Feodora of Leiningen. Through her mother, she was a half great-niece of the British Queen Victoria and her eldest sister Augusta Victoria had been with the Crown Prince of Prussia since 1881 and later Emperor Wilhelm II. She spent a harmonious childhood with her siblings in Dolzig Palace, Kiel and at Primkenau Castle in exile, which since 1853 was owned by her grandfather, Christian August II, Duke of Schleswig-Holstein belonged. The princess was educated exclusively at home by governesses and tutors; She spoke several foreign languages and was artistically talented and interested in many ways.

Her cousin and fellow painter, Lady Helena Gleichen, mentioned her in her 1940 memoir:

A charming cousin named Feo Holstein, daughter of my father's youngest sister, Ada, who had married the Duke of Schleswig-Holstein. She was very nice and very intelligent, a poet and a painter, but terribly hampered by being sister-in-law to the German Emperor who interfered with everything she wanted to do. He would not let her go to an Art School or study from the life; he would not let her go anywhere she wanted to. Her independent spirit was stamping and fuming over all her restrictions, and she envied us for our independence and freedom from all regulations. Considering how little training she had, her writings and drawings were really good and full of imagination. Feo Holstein and I had some very happy times painting out in the lovely Potsdam woods.

Feodora studied at the Art Academy of Fine Arts in Dresden. Her paternal mentor, Privy Councilor Max Lehrs, dedicated words of appreciation to her posthumously: "She was a princess in spirit and what might be more said, a princess of heart..." She maintained a particularly close relationship with Fritz Mackensen, the co-founder of the Artists' Colony Worpswede near Bremen (1889) . Mackensen was her artistic teacher. The Princess visited Mackensen in Worpswede in 1899, where she also came into contact with the other members of the artist community -Heinrich Vogeler, Hans am Ende, Paula Modersohn-Becker, Otto Modersohn – stepped. Vogeler provided the book decoration for her Fischer novel Through the Fog, published in 1908 by G. Grotesche Verlagsbuchhandlung, Berlin.

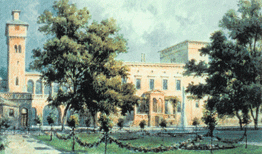
Krongut Bornstedt, around 1905

Princess Feodora, who had been ailing for several years, died unexpectedly on 21 June 1910 on their property in Hochfelden in the Black Forest.

== Ancestry ==
Ancestors of Princess Feodora Adelheid of Schleswig-Holstein-Sonderburg-Augustenburg

8. Frederick Christian II, Duke of Schleswig-Holstein-Sonderburg-Augustenburg
4. Christian August II, Duke of Schleswig-Holstein-Sonderburg-Augustenburg
9. Princess Louise Auguste of Denmark
2. Frederick VIII, Duke of Schleswig-Holstein
10. Count Christian Conrad Danneskiold-Samsøe
5. Countess Louise Sophie Danneskiold-Samsøe
11. Johanne Henriette Valentine Kaas af Mur
1. Princess Feodora Adelheid of Schleswig-Holstein-Sonderburg-Augustenburg
12. Karl Ludwig, Prince of Hohenlohe-Langenburg
6. Ernst I, Prince of Hohenlohe-Langenburg
13. Countess Amalie Henriette of Solms-Baruth
3. Princess Adelheid of Hohenlohe-Langenburg
14. Emich Carl, Prince of Leiningen
7. Princess Feodora of Leiningen
15. Princess Victoria of Saxe-Coburg-Saalfeld
