= Zion's Church, Worpswede =

Zion's Church
- Zionskirche (in German); Zionskark (in Low German)
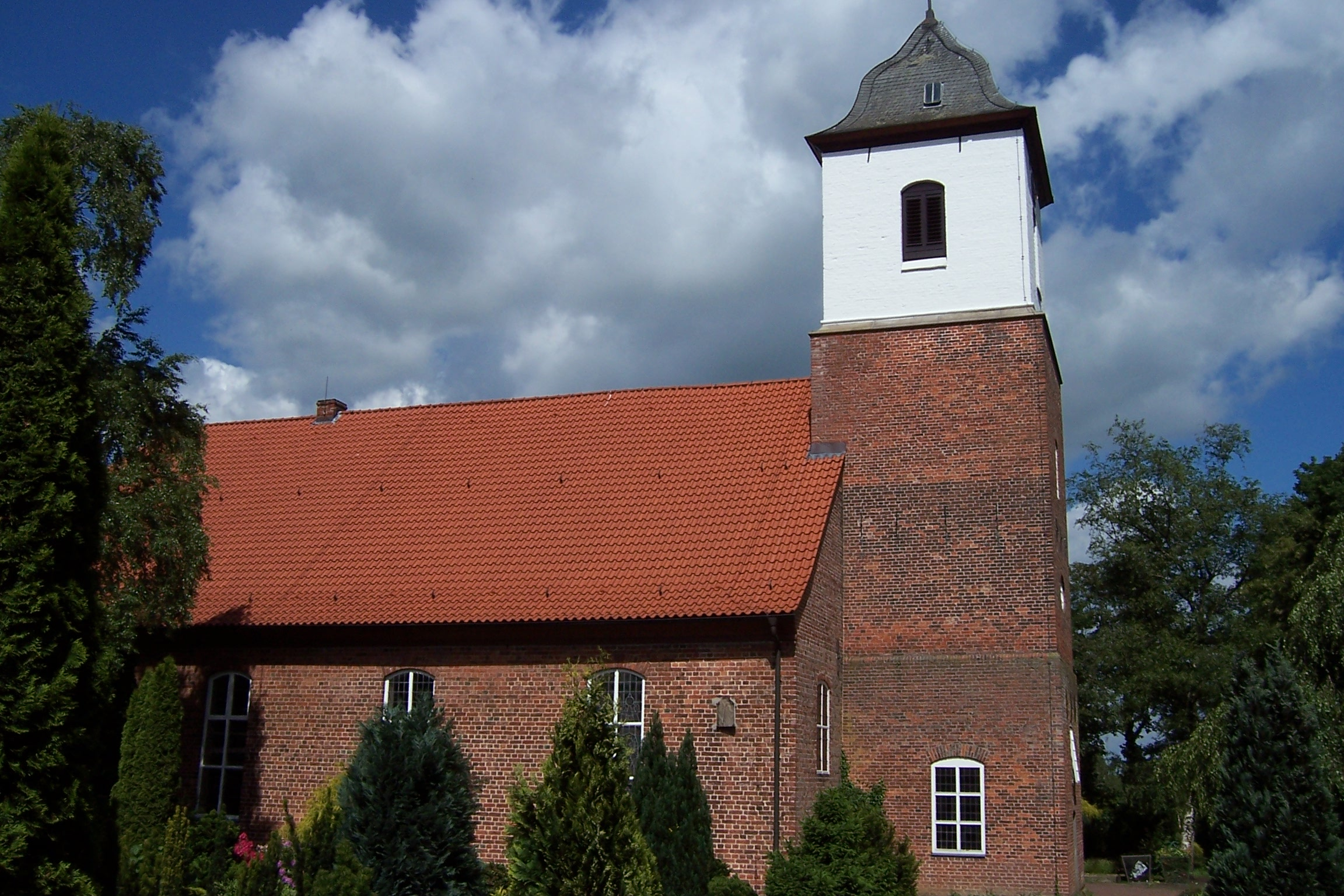
- The northeastern tower seen from the churchyard

- Location within Lower Saxony Location within Germany
- 53°13′14″N 08°55′21″E
- Location: Worpswede
- Country: Germany
- Denomination: Lutheran

Architecture
- Functional status: parish church
- Architect(s): Johann Paul Heumann (design); Jürgen Christian Findorff (construction)
- Architectural type: Hall church
- Style: Rococo and Classical style
- Completed: 1759

Specifications
- Materials: brick

Administration
- Diocese: Stade diocese
- Deanery: Osterholz-Scharmbeck
- Parish: Worpswede

Clergy
- Pastor: Jörn Contag

Zion's Church (German: Zionskirche, Low Saxon: Zionskark) is a Lutheran parish church in Worpswede, Lower Saxony, Germany. The church is used and owned by the Lutheran Congregation of Worpswede within the Evangelical Lutheran State Church of Hanover. It was completed in 1759 and forms a landmark located on top of the Weyerberg hill.

== Church building and furnishings ==
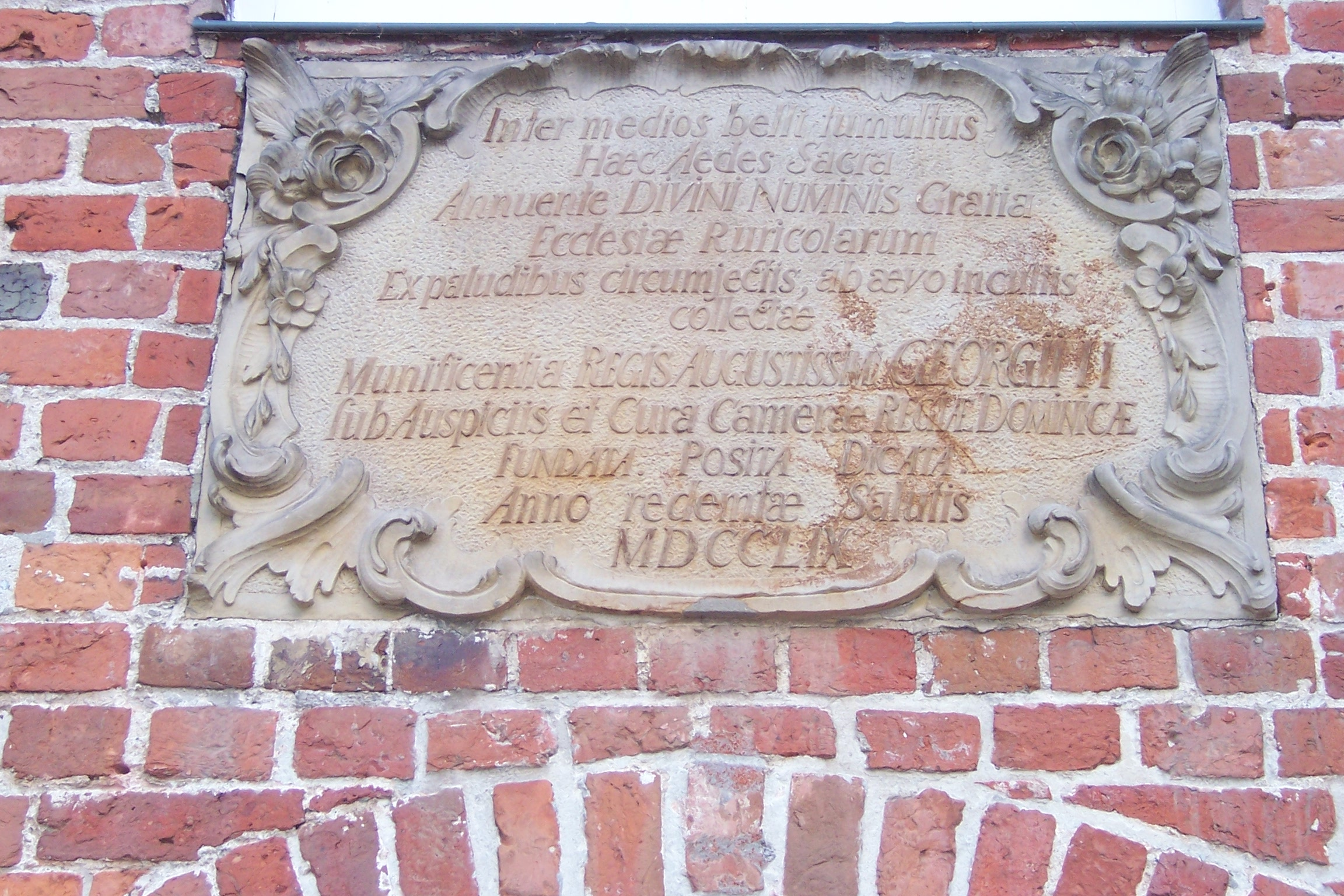
Plaque in Latin commemorating George II as principal of the Zion's Church, hanging on its outside wall

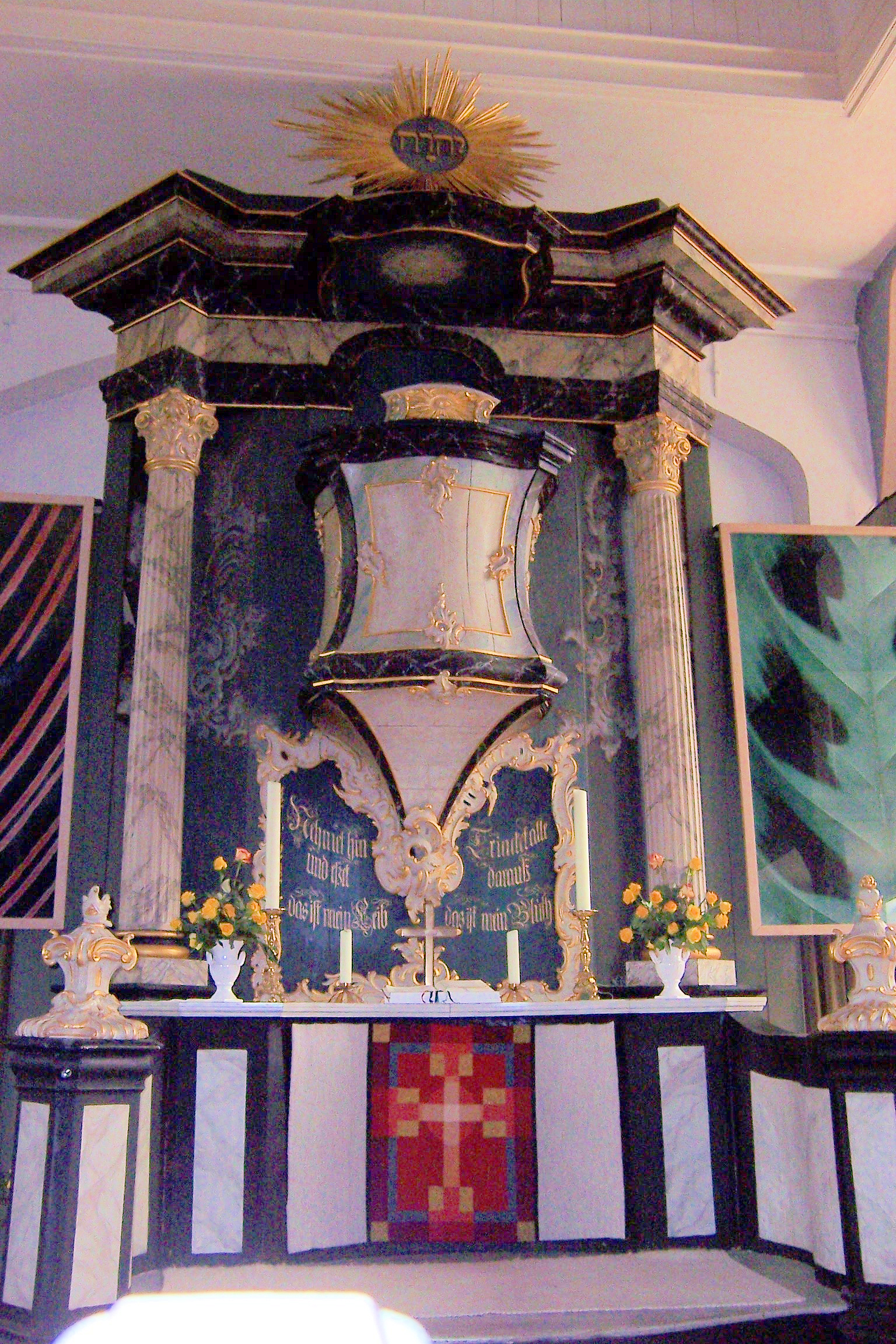
Zion's Church: Typical Protestant Kanzelaltar, topped by the Tetragrammaton of God's Hebrew name יהוה.

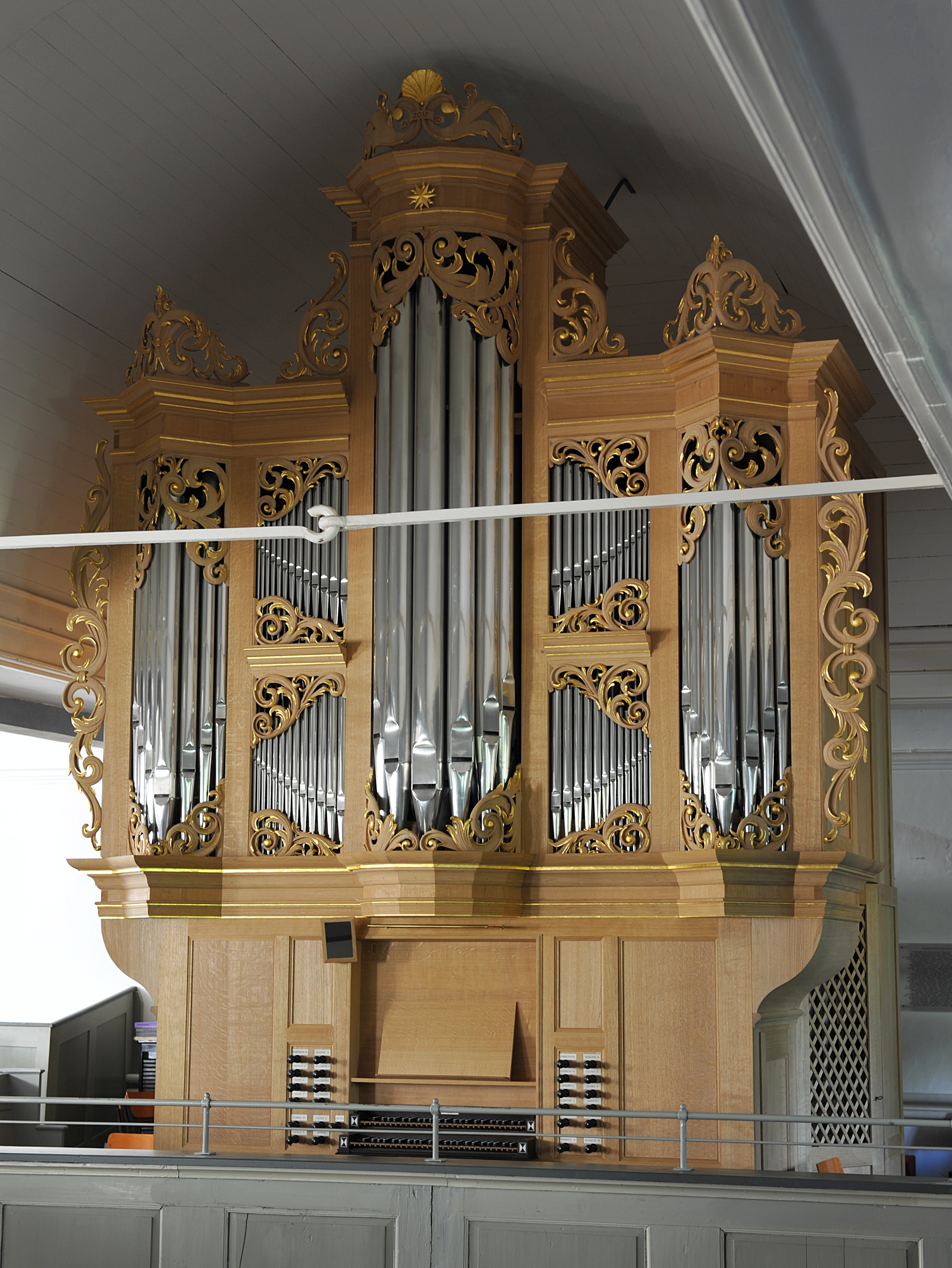
The new organ by Hendrik Ahrend, inaugurated in 2012

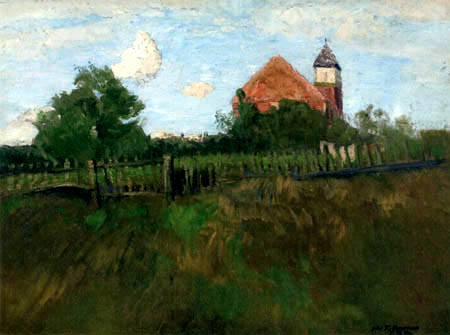
Zion's Church as seen from southwest, painting by Fritz Overbeck, ca. 1900

Moor commissioner Jürgen Christian Findorff carried out the construction of the church building, following the plans by Johann Paul Heumann, Electoral Hanoverian court architect of King and Elector George II Augustus of Great Britain and Hanover. As summus episcopus, i.e. the supreme governor of the Lutheran State Church of Hanover, he provided financial support for the construction of the church. The church was built between 1757 and 1759 during the wearisome Seven Years' War, which had its American version as the Anglo-French and Indian War.

The brick hall church is not oriented, but directed on a southwest–northeast axis. Its else rather modest interior is beautified by a typical Protestant Kanzelaltar, combining pulpit and altar table, created in Rococo forms. The pulpit altar is structured by columns and pilasters, in their midst the pulpit. It bears the Tetragrammaton יהוה in a top aureole and to the left of the pulpit the king's rocaille-ornamented initials GR (Georgius Rex, hidden on the photo by a painting of a temporary exhibition).

Lofts (or matronea) span between the outer walls and the columns of Tuscan style. The structure of the lofts and the columns carrying them show already clear classical influence. In typical classical manner the ceiling was originally completely flat, until in 1898 the central section was changed to barrel vault. Due to the loft columns connecting to the flat ceiling only the central section could be changed to barrel vault, disturbing the classical appearance of the hall, giving the impression of a three-nave structure.

There are heads of cherubim by Clara Westhoff and floral ornaments by Paula Becker at the pendentives and the columns, connecting to the ceiling. After in 1900 Westhoff and Becker, both then members of the artists' colony in Worpswede and still students, had rung the church bells for fun, which was generally understood as a fire alarm, they were fined. They could not pay and were allowed to perform instead by way of offering these decorative elements to the church.

The church tower with its spire in baroque forms had been added at the northeastern end of the actual church building only in 1798. Zion's Church is located on the Weyerberg hill, and with its tower it is a landmark, often used as subject of paintings by the artists.

=== The organ ===
In 1763 Dietrich Christoph Gloger created the first organ, which is not preserved. Deteriorating over many years, several times repaired, it went out of order in the 1890s. A new organ by the Peternell Brothers turned out too prone to repairs and was replaced in 1959. That organ by Alfred Führer underwent the same fate so that the presbytery of the congregation voted for a new organ in 2004. On 4 March 2012 this new organ by Hendrik Ahrend was inaugurated. Following traditions of Arp Schnitger and his disciple Erasmus Bielfeldt, Ahrend designed an instrument resembling in its disposition to Gloger's organ, the disposition of which had been recorded.

== The churchyard ==
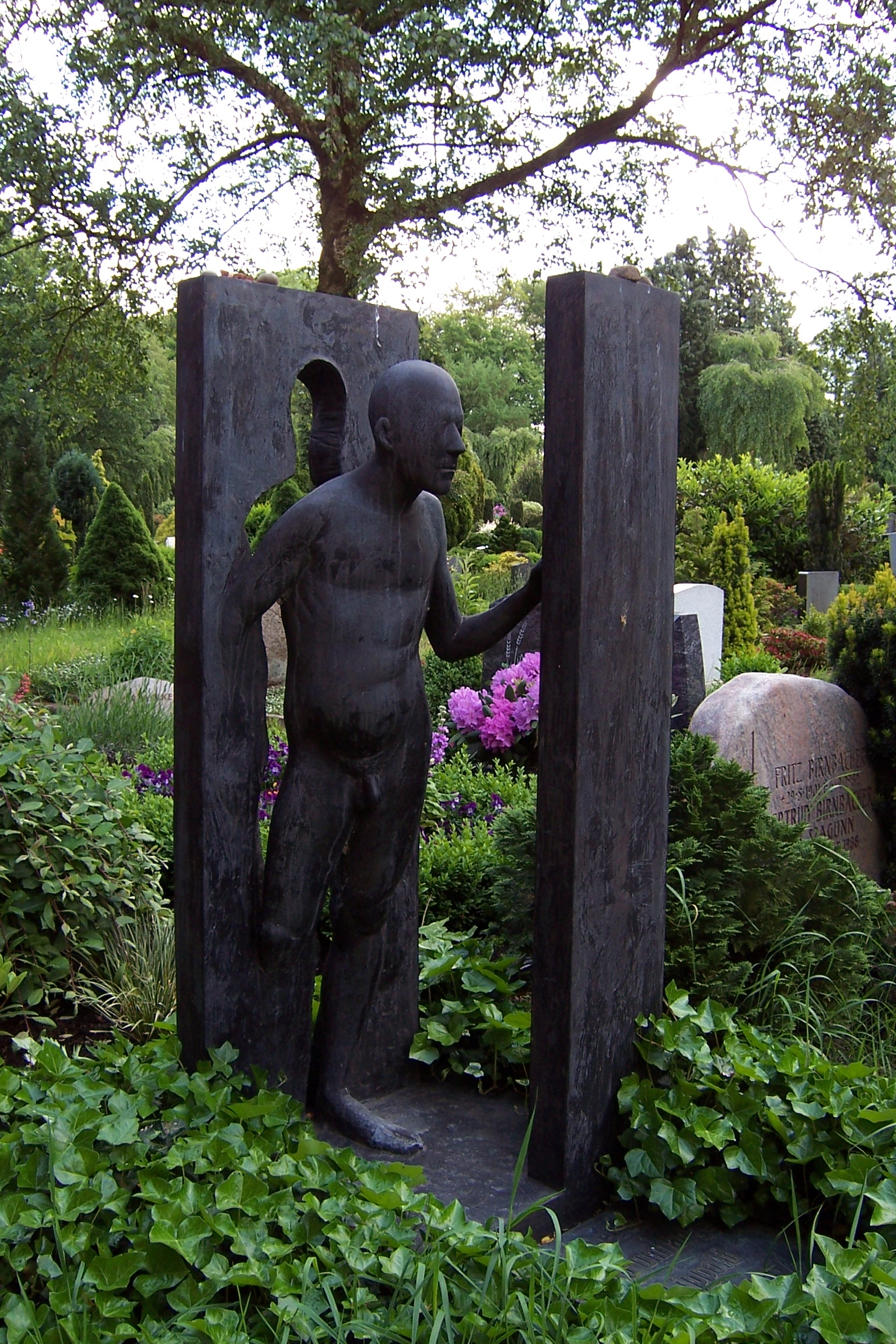
Sculpture Der Übergang (i.e. the passage) by Waldemar Otto on the grave of family Lippold.

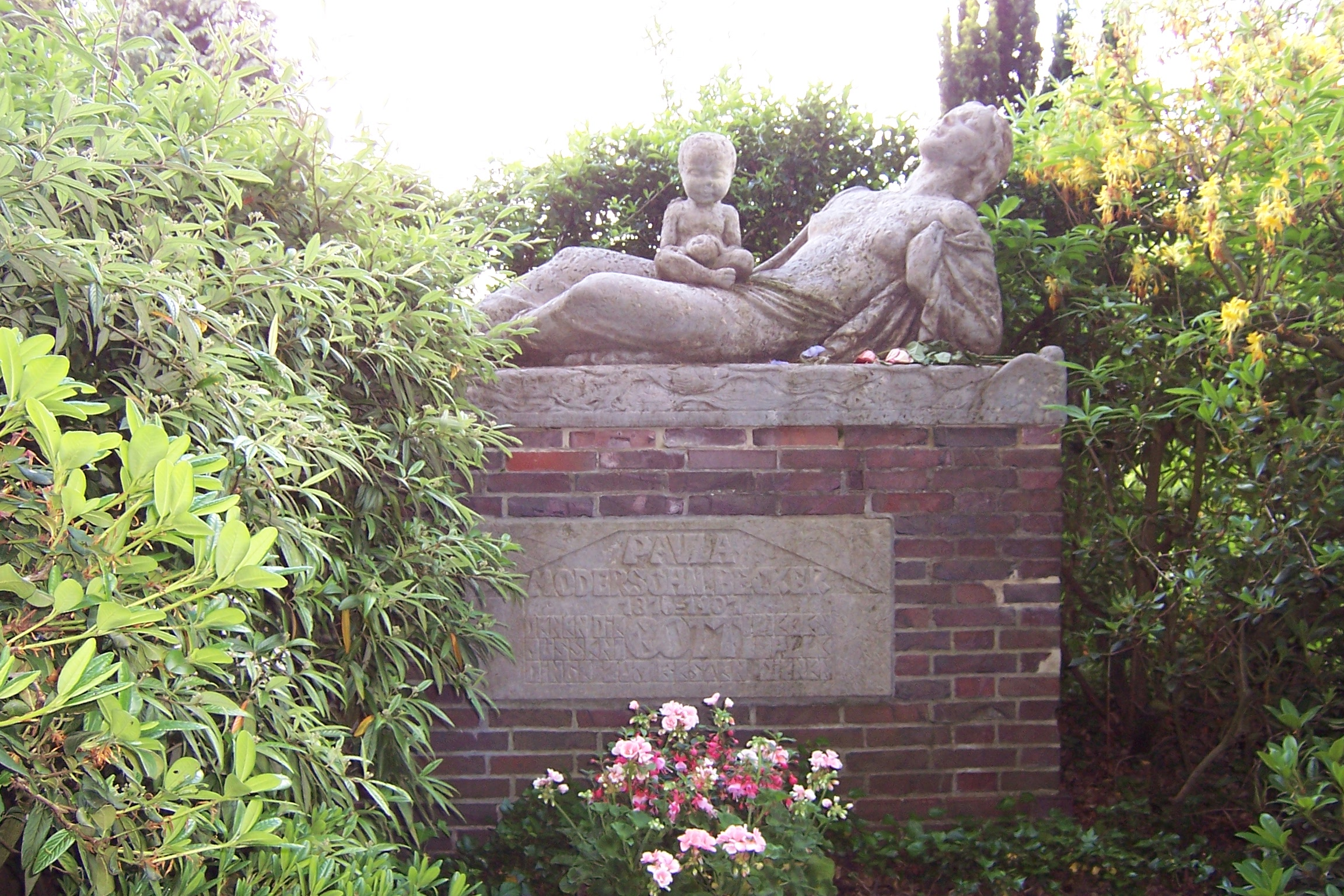
Modersohn-Becker's grave sculpture by Bernhard Hoetger.

The cemetery is a churchyard, thus it actually spreads around the church building. It was designed after plans of Findorff and attracts many visitors because of its elevated location on the Weyerberg and due to the graves preserved there. Among these are those of 80 known painters, authors, musicians and artisans, many of whom were members of the Worpswede Artists' Colony.

=== List of performers of arts and crafts buried in Worpswede ===
- Ludwig Ahner; 1911–1979, sculptor and stone chiseller
- Karl Arste; 1899–1942, painter and author
- Waldemar Augustiny; 1897–1979), author
- Wilhelm Bartsch; 1873–1953, painter
- Annemarie Bertelsmann; 1913–1997, painter
- Erna Bertelsmann, née Lundbeck; 1880-1956, sculptor and painter
- Jürgen Bertelsmann; 1913–1942, painter
- Walter Bertelsmann; 1877–1963, painter and graphic artist
- Sophie Böltjer-Mallet; 1887–1966, painter
- Willy Dammasch; 1887–1982, painter and graphic artist
- Heinz Dodenhoff; 1889–1981, painter and lyricist
- Rudolf Dodenhoff; 1917–1992, photographer
- Hans am Ende; 1864–1918, painter
- Bruno Fischer-Uwe; 1915–1992, painter
- Martin Goldyga; 1894–1956, gallery owner
- Bernhard Huys; aka Benny; 1895–1973, painter
- Herbert Jaeckel; 1904–1981, copperplate engraver
- Bernhard Kaufmann; 1896–1980, publisher
- Martin Kausche; 1915–2007, graphic artist and painter
- Edwin Koenemann; 1883–1960, author
- Karl Krummacher; 1866–1955, painter and author
- Angelika Lehmann-Billaudelle; 1920–1964, sculptor
- Peter Lehmann; 1921–1995, sculptor
- Ernst Licht; 1892–1965, composer
- Fritz Mackensen; 1866–1953, painter
- Otto Meier; 1903–1996, ceramic artist
- Willy Meyer-Osburg; 1934–2005, painter
- Leberecht Migge; 1881–1935, landscape architect, regional planner and protagonist of the life reform movement
- Paula Modersohn-Becker, 1876–1907, painter
- Walter Müller, aka Müller-Worpswede; 1901–1975, graphic artist and interior architect
- Bettina Müller-Vogeler; 1903–2001, handloom weaver and tapestry weaver
- Friedrich Netzel, aka Fritz; 1891–1945, gallery owner and art merchant
- Friedrich Netzel jun.; 1929–1994, gallery owner and art merchant
- Friedrich Netzel sen.; 1854–1931, merchant and bookbinder
- Walter Niemann; 1915–1986, painter and graphic artist
- Willy Ohler; 1888–1975, ceramic artist and painter
- Lisel Oppel; 1897–1960, painter
- Udo Peters; 1884–1964, painter
- Hans-Georg Rauch; 1939–1993, illustrator
- Albert Peter Rehberg, 1895–1956, sculptor
- Werner Rohde; aka Tüt; 1906–1990, painter and photographer
- Eugenie Saebens, née von Garvens; 1881–1964, author
- Hans Saebens; 1895–1969, photographer, graphic artist and painter
- Agnes Sander-Plump; 1888–1980, painter
- Wilhelm Scharrelmann; 1875–1950, author and novelist
- Albert Schiestl-Arding; 1883–1937, painter
- Max Karl Schwarz; 1895–1963, landscape architect
- Fritz Uphoff; 1890–1966, painter
- Lore Uphoff-Schill; 1890–1968, painter
- Jan Vogeler; 1923–2005, philosopher and professor of Lomonosov University
- Martha Vogeler, née Schröder; 1879–1961, painter and tapestry weaver
- Martha Vogeler-Schnaars, aka Mascha; 1905–1993, weaver
- Heide Weichberger; 1922–1980, ceramic artist
- Tobias Weichberger; 1951–1998, painter, etcher and illustrator
- Paul Ernst Wilke; 1894–1971, painter and graphic artist
- Arrigo Wittler; 1918–2004, painter and illustrator
- Maryan Žurek; 1889–1943, painter and sculptor
- Sergius Žurek, cabinet maker
- Charlotte Žurek-Schenk; 1910–1971, painter
