= Anna Feldhusen =

German painter

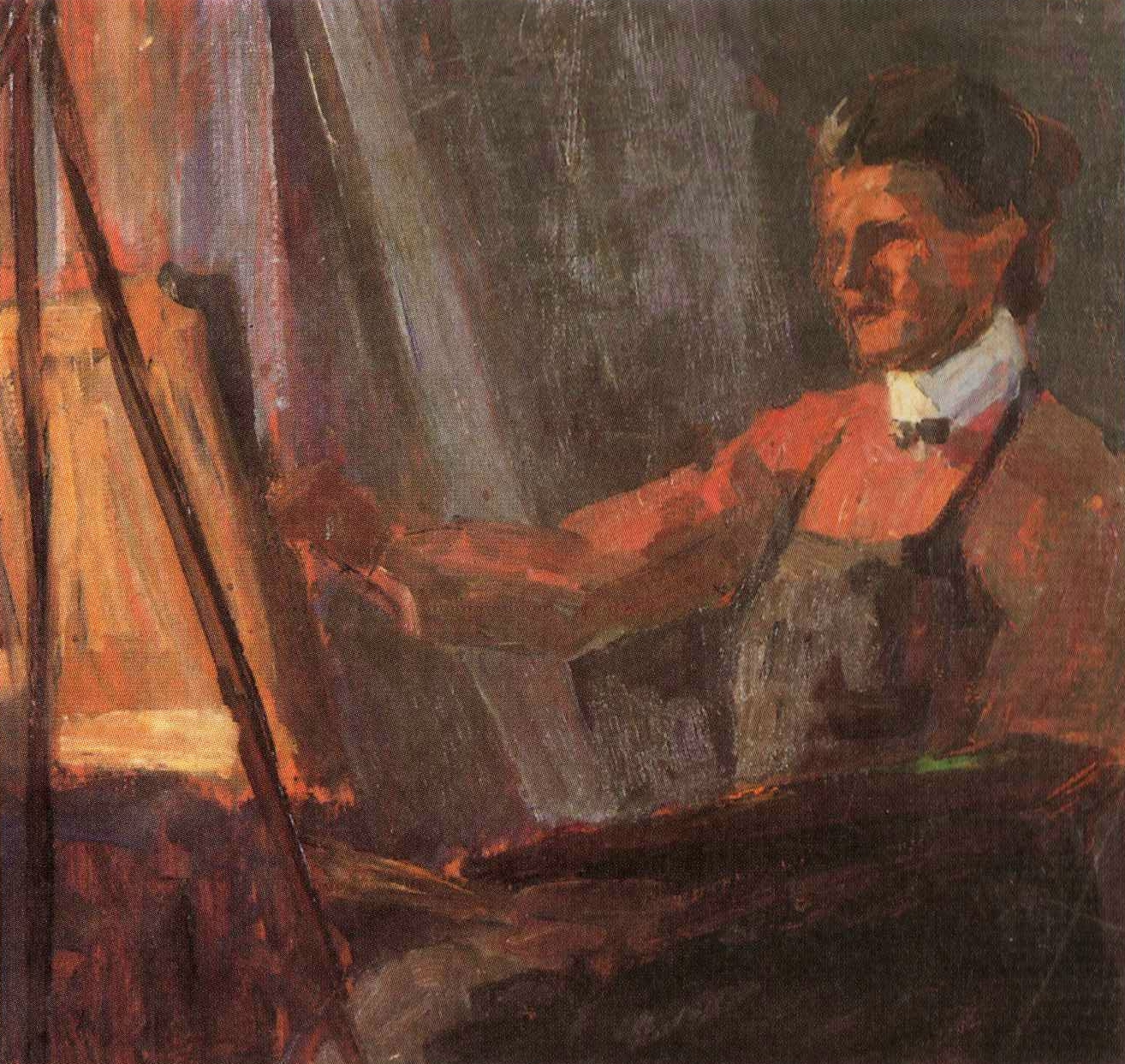
- Self-portrait, 1899
- Born: 17 November 1867; Bremen, North German Confederation
- Died: 12 June 1951; Bremen, West Germany
- Occupation: Painter
- Parent(s): Johann Philipp Feldhusen; Friederike Berding

Anna Feldhusen (17 November 1867 – 12 June 1951) was a German painter. She was a prolific producer of still life paintings, of landscape paintings featuring the flat and frequently watery landscapes of north-western Germany and of cityscapes of Bremen, her home city. She was also an able draftswoman with an exceptional talent for producing multi-coloured etchings.

== Biography ==
Anna Feldhusen was born and grew up in Bremen at a time when rapid industrial and commercial development, combined with an agricultural depression exacerbated by the increasing availability of inexpensive food imports from overseas (often imported via the port of Bremen) were driving a sustained mass-migration from the countryside to the German cities as people looked for ways to find higher and more predictable incomes. In the case of Bremen, during the second half of the nineteenth century the pressures of intensifying urbanisation triggered a counter-wave of artists, often from prosperous mercantile families, escaping to an art colony in the countryside, the Künstlerkolonie Worpswede. Johann Philipp Feldhusen, Anna's father, was a Bremen businessman. There were two more sisters. She determined to make her way in life as a professional artist at an early age, moving to Munich in 1892 to obtain the necessary instruction. She was taught by Caroline "Lina" Kempter (1856–1925) who taught at the Damenakademien München und Berlin und Malerinnenschule Karlsruhe of the Münchner Künstlerinnenverein (Munich Academy of Women Artists), and also by the Munich-based painter-professor and medal designer Maximilian Dasio (1865–1954) and by Oskar Graf, a leading figure of the Dachau art colony on the northern side of Munich. The seriousness and determination that Feldhusen applied to securing her artistic training was regarded as "unusual" in Bremen at this time: the daughters of the city merchants were expected to aspire to making a good marriage and thereafter to running an efficient household for the benefit of husbands and sons (and daughters). The motto Feldhusen added to her "ex-libris" stickers (identifying her as the owner in each of her books) was "Allein, ich will..." (loosely "Alone, I want and I will...") also reflects a determination to manage her life as an artist according to her own precepts and priorities, regardless of the gender-fixated expectations of others.

Admirers cite Feldhusen's 1899 self-portrait, reproduced at the top of this article, as a further indicator of the self-confidence and self-knowledge with which she approached her art. On concluding her studies in Munich she returned north and made the acquaintance of a number of members of the Künstlerkolonie Worpswede in the drained marshlands north of Bremen. She took lessons from Fritz Mackensen (1866–1953) and Hans am Ende (1864–1918): Ende was particularly admired by the artistic community for the skills in etching, which he was happy to share with Feldhusen. She also became a regular visit to the picture-book village of Dötlingen in the countryside to the west of Bremen. At some stage she acquired a summer cabin in the village. Although Feldhusen's Dötlingen stays were restricted to the summer months, they were nevertheless frequent; and she had a number of friends among the local artists of Künstlerkolonie Dötlingen. She received drawing lessons and inspiration from Georg Müller vom Siel (1865–1939). It was during her stays in Dötlingen that she first came to know vom Siel's student Marie "Mieze" Stumpe (1877–1946), who subsequently became a close friend. Stumpe's husband was a successful tobacco importer in Bremen, and Feldhusen frequently stayed overnight at her friend's summer home in Dötlingen. It was also in Dötlingen that Feldhusen met Marie Stein-Ranke (1873–1964), regarded by contemporaries as one of the outstanding etching-portraitists of her generation.

Throughout her career, Feldhusen had her own studio. Her Bremen studio was a room in the house at Hagenauerstrasse 24, the home which for a time she shared with her sisters. At an early stage she also acquired a studio in Munich which she liked to use during the winter months, appreciating the "stimulating" atmosphere of the Bavarian capital. Close by she had additional studio facilities at Dachau where she liked to inter-act with others involved with the artists' colony in the (not yet internationally infamous) little town. Even while being based in the north, during the spring and summer months, she retained the lease on her little apartment in Dachau so that she might at any time return and spend a couple of weeks there.

Both directly and indirectly, Feldhusen campaigned for the rights of women artists. She joined the "Bremer Malerinnenverein" (loosely, "Bremen women artists' association") in 1902, the "Bremer Künstlerbund" (loosely, "Bremen artists' league") in 1922 and the nationally based "GEDOK" ("Society of German and Austrian Women's Artists' Associations of all genres") in 1929. Feldhusen was a member of the "Bund der Düsseldorfer Künstlerinnen" ("League of Düsseldorf women artists"). She was, in addition, a longstanding member of the "Dachauer Künstlerbund" ("Dachau artists' league"). In 1924 she acquired a business license as an art business. It was a not uncommon device for artists wishing to make a living from their artistic work, but she was, and for many years would remain, the only woman to take this step. She would sign her artworks, for the avoidance of any unnecessary doubt, with the tagline "Bremische Malerin und Graphikerin" ("Bremen woman painter and graphic artist"). Feldhusen was still selling her own artworks well into her old age.

Many people, especially those from in and around the State of Bremen, became familiar with Feldhusen's work through the Christmas Bazaar organised by the Bremen Cathedral community, at which prints of her etchings could were sold. Several generations were and are made familiar with her images of the city and region through their continuing appearance in Bremen school teaching books. One indication of her prodigious output comes from the accounting records of the arts publishers in Worpswede: These include more than 150 contracts for print runs of her images in excess of 1,000. Between 1903 and 1942 exhibitions of her work took place regularly. These were mostly exhibitions of works offered for sale arranged in the graphics sections of the Bremen "Kunsthalle" art museum or in the artwork displays in the smaller museums and galleries along the Böttgerstraße. (Note: Click this link for information on the "Museen Böttcherstraße" today (in German).) Some of her etchings have been taken into the collection of the city's "Gewerbemuseum" (loosely, "Commercial Museum", subsequently renamed as the "Focke Museum"). Her work is also to be found reproduced in the many calendars, magazines and books in which it appeared.

== Works ==
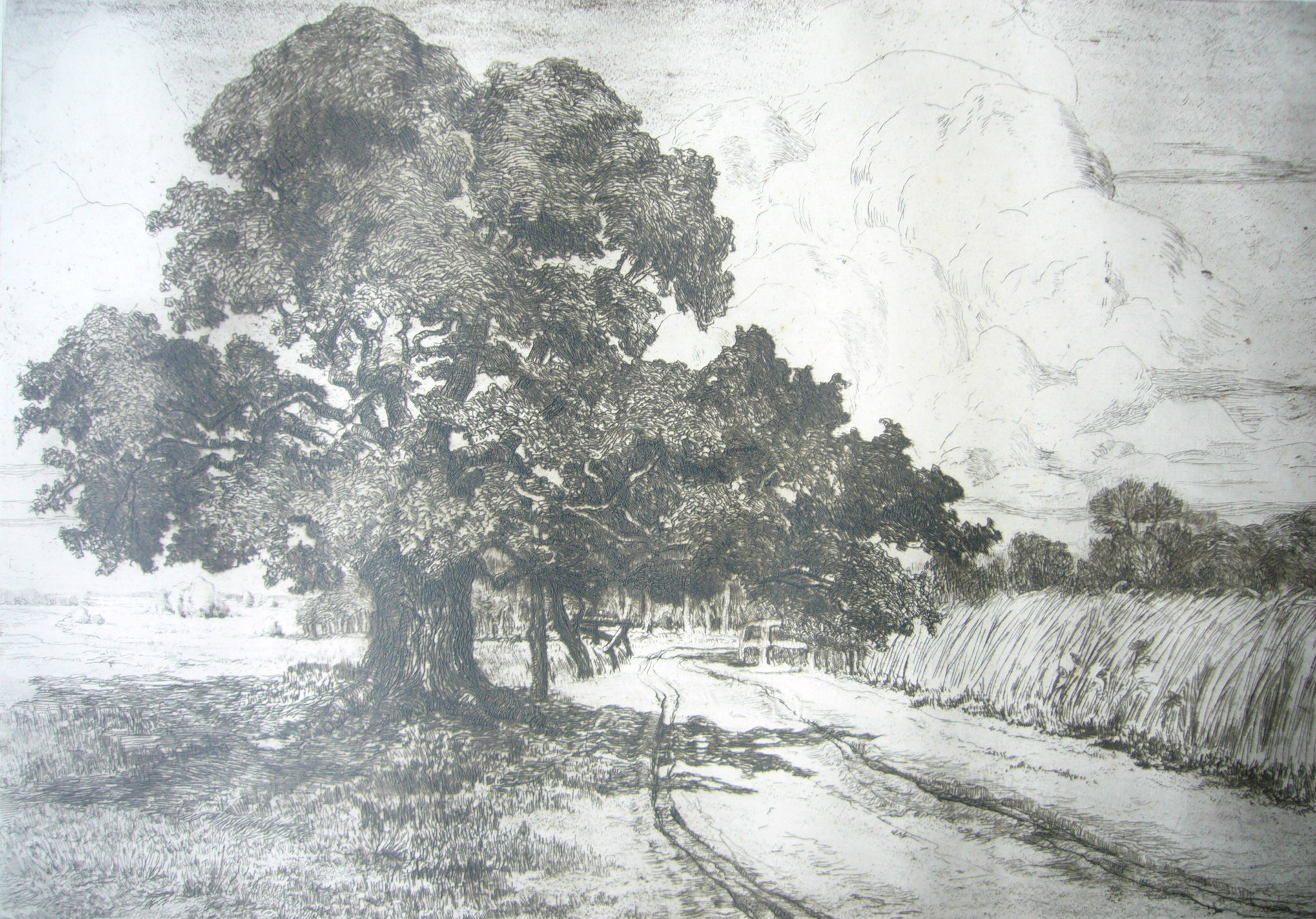
Old Oak Anna Feldhusen

Feldhusen was primarily interested in still life and landscape paintings. Figurative representations are rarely to the fore in her work. When looking for artistic themes, she was drawn to nature. Her many works return again and again to the heather moors around Worpswede and the peaty marshland surrounding Dachau. During her long daily hikes across the countryside she would observe the interplay of light and shadow. What she observed was translated onto canvas with broad expressive brushstrokes.

In terms of technical modalities, the focus of her work is on etching. She became expert in multi-coloured etching and used the possibilities afforded by the technique in various ways. Her principal subjects included a range of Bremen cityscapes: buildings and alleys, veduta panoramas of the city from the Weser, glimpses frequently restricted by the street layouts of the old city, are all precisely drafted reproductions of the realities she witnessed. They were mostly set down as line etchings. Complementary colouring was added to support the mood of the image, either directly as colour etchings or subsequently, applying watercolour paints. The graphical structure of each image always remained the central structure, for which the colouring was never more than supplementary. Often differently coloured prints were produced from a single plate based on the same line-etching.

The many landscapes she produced of the countryside in and around Worpswede display a range of artistic approaches. Some, particularly those from her especially productive period around 1903–04, are characterized by a broader, more economical handling of paint, with less emphasis on perspective and less of the meticulous detail found in her cityscapes.The landscapes tend to use aquatint. Their expressive quality is achieved not so much by invoking a wide range of different colours as through a variability of the shading, achieved through the alternative technology selected.

Although Anna Feldhusen's work fell from critical and public favour for a number of years following her death in 1951, prices achieved at auctions during and since the 1970s indicate a progressive marketplace rehabilitation.
