= Hermine Overbeck-Rohte =

German painter

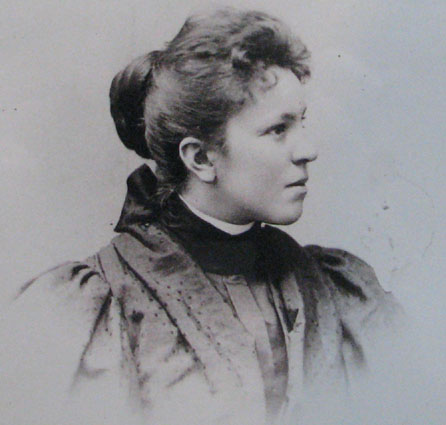
Hermine Overbeck-Rohte (date unknown)

Hermine Overbeck-Rohte (24 January 1869, Walsrode - 29 July 1937, Bremen) was a German landscape painter.

== Biography ==
She was born to a family of leather manufacturers. She expressed an early desire to be a painter and received some lessons, but after her father's death in 1881, she was sent to an older sister in Itzehoe to learn housekeeping. Later, she studied nursing in Hannover, but continued to take art lessons. The landscape painter, Paul Koken, advised her to study in Munich, but she followed her family's wishes and became a tutor for a professor's family in Göttingen.

In 1892, she finally decided to study art at the Women's Academy in Munich, where she took part in the annual exhibitions. After seeing works by Fritz Overbeck at a showing in the Munich Glaspalast, she and a friend went to the artists' colony in Worpswede to take lessons from him. In October, 1896, she and Overbeck became engaged. They were married the following year.

In 1904, she was diagnosed with tuberculosis and found it increasingly difficult to paint, so Fritz designed a special easel that allowed her to work lying down. In 1905 they moved to Vegesack (now part of Bremen). From 1908 to 1909, her condition worsened and she had to stay at a sanatorium in Davos. Shortly after she was released, Fritz died suddenly of a stroke, aged only 39.

After that, she devoted her time to preserving his legacy, and painted little. The inflation that followed World War I left her in dire financial straits, forcing her to rent rooms in the family home. Later, she made some money doing illustrations. She died in 1937 as the result of an automobile accident.

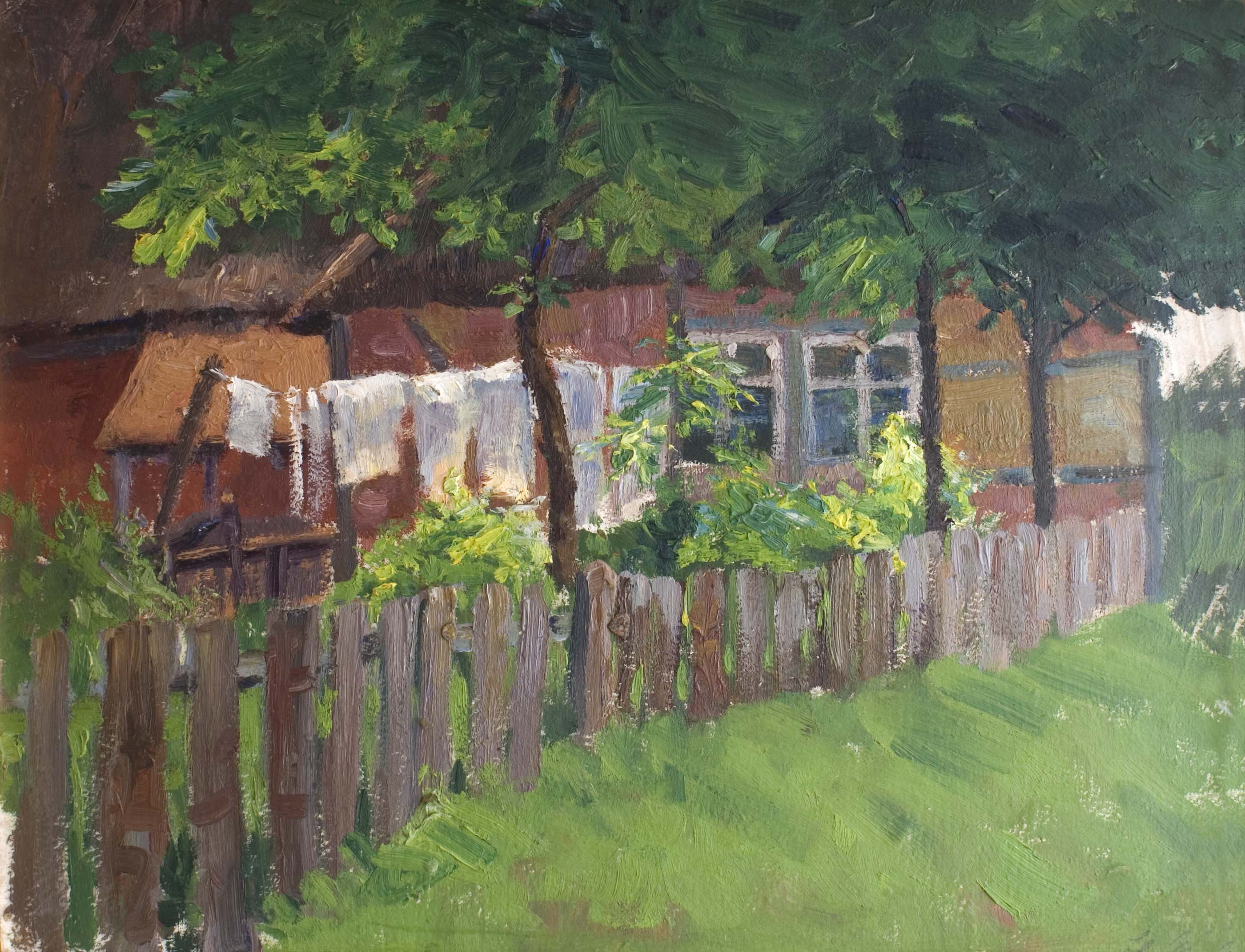
Drying Laundry

In 1990, the "Fritz und Hermine Overbeck Foundation" was established by her granddaughter, Gertrud. The following year, her works were given their first solo exhibition
