= Fritz Mackensen =

German painter (1866–1953)

- Fritz Mackensen (1928)
- Born: 8 April 1866; Greene, Einbeck, German Empire
- Died: 12 May 1953 (aged 87); Bremen, West Germany
- Known for: painting, sculpture

Fritz Mackensen (8 April 1866 – 12 May 1953) was a German painter. He was one of the co-founders of the artists' colony at Worpswede.

== Biography ==
He was born in Greene, Einbeck. Mackensen, like his brother, the architect Wilhelm Mackensen, was son of the master baker Ludwig Mackensen and his wife Luise. The optician and inventor Otto Mackensen was his half-brother, while his uncle was the civil engineer Ernst Mackensen. He attended the Ducal Gymnasium Holzminden, where Carl Büttger was his drawing teacher. Since 1884, he studied together with Otto Modersohn and Fritz Overbeck at the Düsseldorf Academy of Fine Arts, and in 1888/89, with Friedrich August von Kaulbach and Wilhelm von Diez at the Munich Academy of Fine Arts.

As early as 1884, following the invitation of the merchant's daughter Mimi Stolte, Mackensen discovered the moorland village of Worpswede, with its typical landscape and farming population, and started to spend the summer months there. At the mission festival that summer in neighboring Schlußdorf, Mackensen found the subject for his monumental painting (almost 3 × 5 m) Open-Air Worship Service (Landesmuseum Hannover), which depicts the Schlußdorf residents absorbed in prayer, with their simple houses in the background. In 1889, fellow painters Modersohn and Hans am Ende joined him, and in 1893/94, Overbeck and Heinrich Vogeler.

During the winter months of 1892/93, Mackensen was a master student of Christian Ludwig Bokelmann, in Karlsruhe and Berlin. In 1895/96, he participated in the Munich Annual Exhibitions of Artists of All Nations at the Munich Glass Palace, where his painting Open-Air Worship Service exhibited in 1895, was awarded the Gold Medal, First Class, and established the reputation of the Worpswede artists' colony. In 1896, he received a small gold medal at the International Art Exhibition in Berlin. In 1889, he was a co-founder of the Worpswede artists' colony. Mackensen lived permanently in Worpswede from 1895 to 1904, and taught, among others, Paula Modersohn-Becker, Georg Harms-Rüstringen, Ottilie Reylaender, and Clara Westhoff.

In 1908, he accepted a professorship at the Weimar Academy of Fine Arts, becoming its director in 1910. Among his students was Marianne Brandt, who later became a designer at Bauhaus. Mackensen returned to the Worpswede artists' colony in 1918.

After the defeat of Germany at World War I, he became a member of the Stahlhelm, for which he also wrote articles, as well as of the Völkisch-minded, anti-semitic Kampfbund für deutsche Kultur (Combat League for German Culture).

From 1933 to 1935, he was entrusted with the establishment and management of the Nordische Kunsthochschule in Bremen (today's University of the Arts Bremen).

On May 1, 1937, he joined the Nazi Party (membership number 5,767,390). Mackensen became a respected artist during the Nazi era; he was represented at the first Great German Art Exhibition in the Munich House of German Art, in 1937, with the painting Church Service in the Moor.

In 1941, he received the Goethe Medal for Art and Science. In 1942, at the age of 76, he was stationed in occupied northern France as a major in the Propaganda Replacement Unit, where he painted seascapes and beach scenes. In the final stages of the World War II, in August 1944, Hitler included him on the Gottbegnadeten list (List of God-Gifted Artists), which protected him from further military service, even on the home front.

Among other works, he wrote Worpswede and its First Painters (1940).

Fritz Mackensen was a board member of the German Artists' Association.

He died in Bremen, in 1953, aged 87 years old. He was buried in the Worpswede Cemetery.

== Private life ==
He was married to the painter Hertha Mackensen (1884–1949), née Stahlschmidt, who was also his student, since 1907.

== Selected works ==
paintings

- Gottesdienst im Freien, Lower Saxony State Museum in Hanover
- Tierbild, State Museum for Art and Cultural History in Oldenburg in Oldenburg
- Die Scholle, museum Weimar

bronze sculpture

- Alte Frau mit Ziege, Kunsthalle Bremen

== Bibliography ==
- Klaus Dede: Fritz Mackensen. Der Entdecker Worpswedes. (1981), Atelier im Bauernhaus, ISBN 3-88132-132-2.
