= Weyerberg =

Sandy geest island in Germany

Coordinates: 53°12′58″N 8°55′25″E

Map

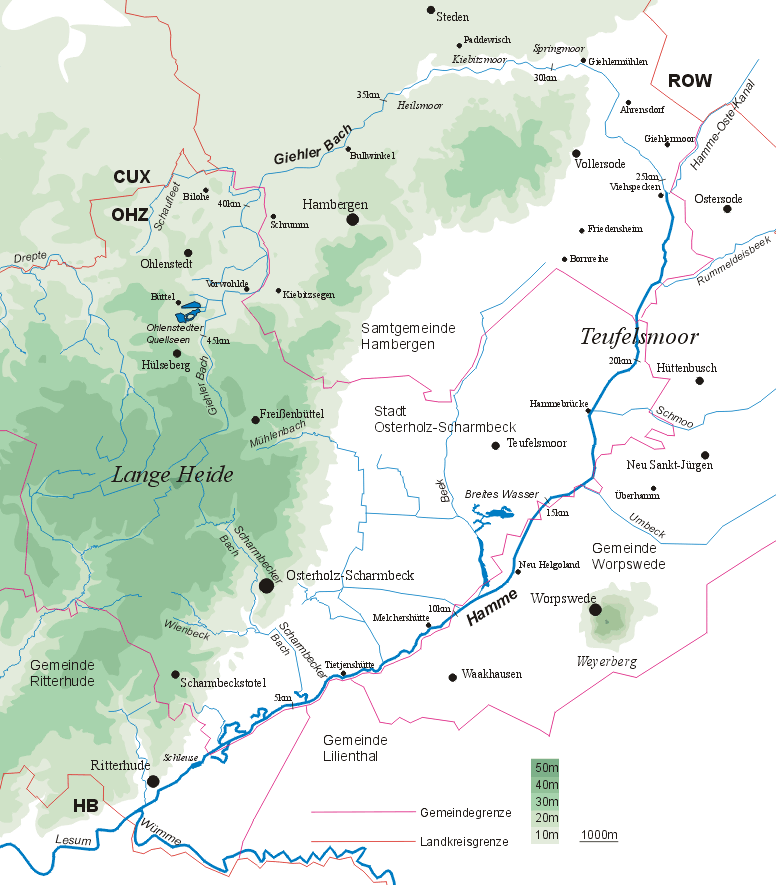
The Weyerberg in relation to the Teufelsmoor and the river system of the Hamme

The Weyerberg is a sandy geest island, 54.4 metres (178 ft) high, in the Teufelsmoor ("Devil's Bog") in Northern Germany. It is located near its main settlement of Worpswede in the district of Osterholz in Lower Saxony. Its name means something like 'wooded hill'. It probably emerged at the end of the ice age, when meltwaters deposited sand around its clay core.

Traces of the New Stone Age were found on and around the hill: stone tools and items of jewellery. Urn graves dating to 1100 BC were discovered on the southern slopes, the Hinterm Berg. In 500 BC, the hill was abandoned as a settlement again as the climate cooled down.

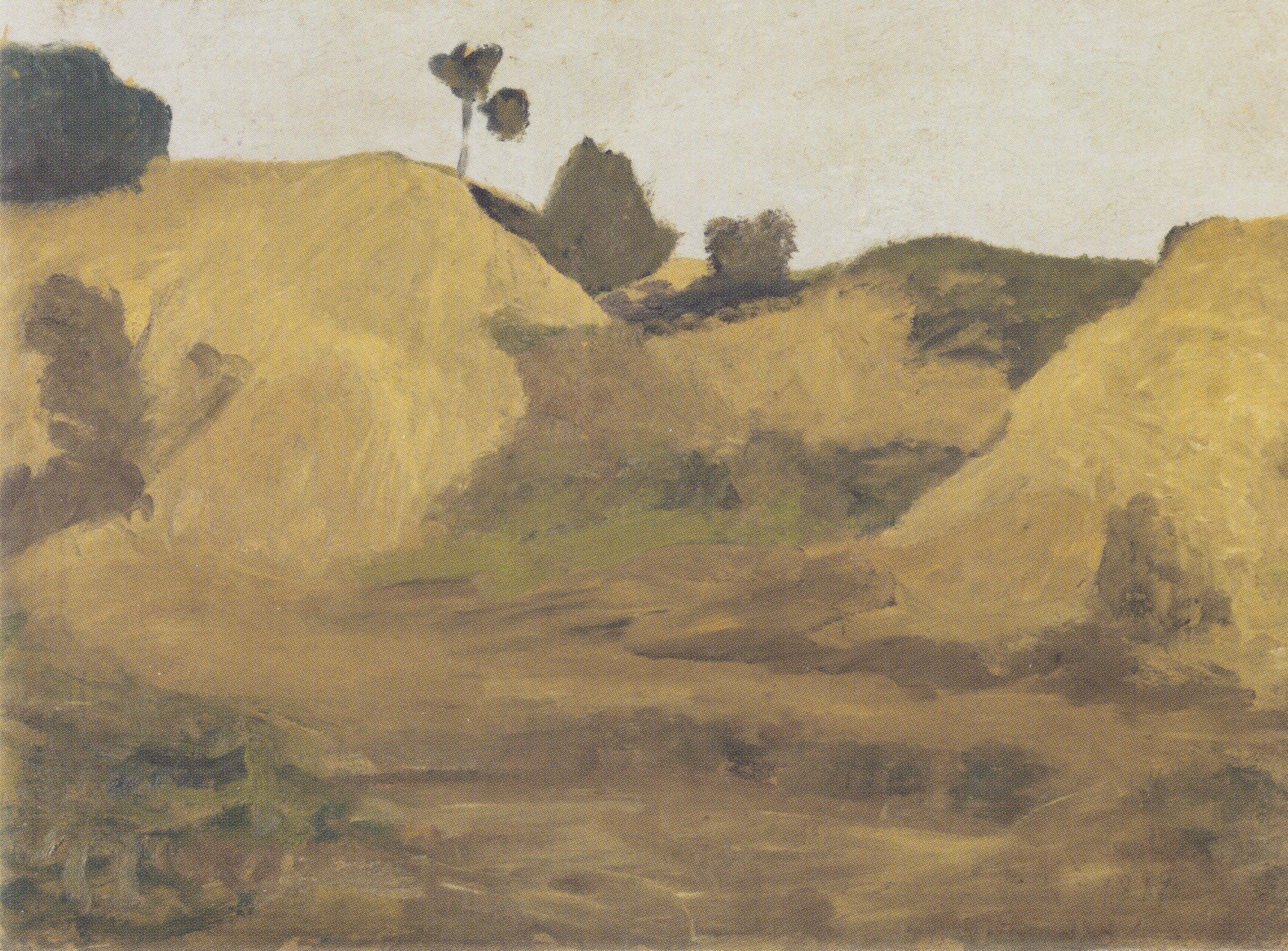
Sand pit at the Weyerberg by Paula Modersohn-Becker, 1899

In 1218 Worpswede was first mentioned in the records because the eight farms there were tithing to Osterholz Abbey.

Several landmarks are located on the Weyerberg, such as the Cheese Dome House after designs by Bruno Taut, the Lower Saxony Stone by Bernhard Hoetger, and the Zion's Church. Painters of Worpswede's artists' colony often chose the Weyerberg as their scene or subject. In 1957 the Stiftung Worpswede was founded that sought through land purchase to prevent further sand quarrying on the Weyerberg.

== Sources ==
- Hans-Gerhard Kulp: Der Weyerberg und das Teufelsmoor – ein landschaftsökologischer Führer. Hrsg.: Biologische Station Osterholz, Verlag M. Simmering 1995, Lilienthal
- Wendula Dahle (Hrsg.): Im Land der Moore und Deiche. Ausflüge links und rechts der Weser. Ein Reise- und Lesebuch. Edition Temmen, 5. Aufl. 2005, ISBN 3-86108-466-X
