= Leberecht Migge =

German landscape architect (1881–1935)

Leberecht Migge (March 30, 1881 in Danzig (now Gdańsk, Poland) – May 30, 1935 in Worpswede) was a German landscape architect, regional planner and polemical writer. He was best known for integrating social gardening principles into the Siedlungswesen (settlement) movement during the Weimar Republic. In recent decades, his work has gained renewed interest due to its relevance to contemporary sustainability concerns.

== Career beginning ==
In 1904 Migge began his career with the Gartenbau firm of Jacob Ochs of Hamburg. His tenure with Ochs primarily involved designing private gardens and estates for wealthy clients, as well as outdoor furniture and the peculiarly-German style of arbors or bowers known as Lauben. Despite such commissions, Migge began expressing his social ideals in 1909 with the publication of the pamphlet Der Hamburger Stadtpark und die Neuzeit: Die heutigen öffentlichen Gärten — dienen sie in Wahrheit dem Volke? (The Hamburg City Park and Modern Times: Today's Public Garden—do they really serve the people?) It is around this time as well that he became familiar with the American public parks movement. The influential 1911 publication Amerikanische Parkanlangen by Werner Hegemann contains numerous contemporary German gardens modeled in the American style—all designed by Migge.

Feeling increasingly dissatisfied designing for the wealthy, Migge left Ochs’ employ in 1913 and began working on public parks (Volksparks). Migge viewed the prototype of the English landscape garden, a style common in Germany since its importation in the late 18th century (as evidenced by the Englischer Garten in Munich and the Dessau-Wörlitz Garden Realm), as merely a bourgeois aesthetic ideal for urban green spaces, inadequate for the needs of the working classes inhabiting the increasingly crowded cities.

His 1913 book, Die Gartenkultur des XX.Jahrhunderts (The Garden Culture of the 20th Century), explains that all higher garden types came from utility gardens based on ancient basic geometric forms, and that the form of the naturalistic garden, like that of the contemporary public park, was the result of decadent cultural conditions arising from industrialization. Through historical development, all landscape types came from this original, geometric ur-type—a garden plot for growing food.

During World War I and immediately thereafter, Migge designed sport park memorials, where the dead would be commemorated by youth participating in athletics. He rejected the grandiose prototypes for war memorials in favor of designs in which every grave acted as an individual flower bed, the totality of the scheme forming a garden. The food shortages of World War I also prompted an interest in the utopian ideal of an industrial city incorporating farm plots for everyone, an ideal outlined in Migge's 1919 treatise Jedermann Selbstversorger (Everybody Self-Sufficient).

== Gardens for Weimar Housing ==
Influenced by the Russian anarchist Peter Kropotkin, Migge's communal, grass-roots socialism led to his involvement with the Siedlungswesen movement after the First World War. In 1920, with architect Martin Wagner, Migge founded the Stadtland-Kulturgesellschaft Gross-Hamburg und Gross-Berlin for the instigation of a new policy for settlement of the land. Migge was technical and totally urban, seeing the expansion of industrial cities as inevitable. During the 1920s, Migge adhered to a pragmatic, socially meaningful Functionalism, at odds with the ideological, aesthetic Functionalism that was a tenet of the burgeoning International Style. His plantings and park designs were disciplined and architectonic. Yet his characteristic use of the Trampelpfade (paths trampled randomly over time by users) in his parks belies the rigidity of many of his designs. He also emphasized the relation of plant material to technology—the “Wesen der Pflanze” (the character of plants) over their purely aesthetic use.

Later in the 1920s, Migge's designs moved from individual productive garden plots (based on the Kleingarten and Schrebergarten model) to the Kolonial Parks, grouping smaller plots around a communal park area. In his 1926 book Die Deutsche Binnen-Kolonisation (German Inland-Colonization), Migge described gardens as industrial products that were essentially tools for better living. He viewed the garden not as a bourgeois escape from industrialized society but rather as a mechanized object, a compatible means of improving life in a mechanized society. The notion of colonization from within was also a criticism of Wilhelmine Germany's imperialist ambitions. Although Migge saw the virtue in resettlement outside the city as a means of connecting back to the land, his ideas for organizing space applied to the urban inhabitant, the overriding concepts being a part of a comprehensive urban regional planning.

He emphasized maximum efficiency in his garden system, stressing that there was a complete connectivity with the systems of dwelling and the organic system of the garden. He incorporated an experimental farm and intensive Siedlerschule (settlement school) in his designs at the artists’ colony of Worpswede in 1926. He was also interested in utilizing sewage for fertilization, designing several versions of the urban outhouse, the Metroklo. Both wastewater from the dwelling units as well as human feces from dry toilets were both captured to be used in the gardens at Worpswede.

Working with leading architects of the Weimar Republic (Ernst May in Frankfurt, Martin Wagner and Bruno Taut in Berlin, Otto Haessler in Celle), Migge's designs for the Siedlungen (settlements) characteristically comprised low-lying small flats or row houses, with adjacent or nearby garden plots. One of the Siedlungen that best expressed this system was Ziebigk in Dessau, designed with Leopold Fischer in 1926 and completed in 1929. Migge also invented a “growing house” to provide housing in the form of a wall to which small units could be added when needed or when affordable. Stressing the importance of the occupant in the planning, use and shaping of the dwelling space, Migge considered the dwelling unit as malleable based on need. The wall was a key element in his designs linking architecture and landscape. In the new housing developments of the 1920s, the Schutzmauer (protective walls) were active functional elements, not merely separating plots, the geometric lines of the Siedlung blocks extending into the garden as part of an overall rational ordering system.

The interpenetration of architecture and landscape along organized rational geometric lines was central to Migge's architectural ideology. Extensive use of glass—both as doors and windows—formed the Zwischenglieder (interstices) between outside and inside, providing a spiritual connection to the sun, while greenhouses provided winter protection by encircling the dwelling units.

Even during the progressive era of the Weimar Republic, Migge's designs were often criticized for being too functional and for ignoring the simple fact that many people would be unwilling to maintain the individual garden plots that were so crucial to his theoretical ideas. Migge's political leanings were rather ambiguous, his interest in getting back to the land being considered reactionary by some, while his dedication to the improvement of workers’ living conditions were attributed by others as Communism.

Nazi ideology later seized upon certain of the principles and vocabulary Migge's strain of Functionalism.

In addition to the above-mentioned books and treatises, Migge wrote Der soziale Garten (The Social Garden), which served as a declaration of his social ideas in landscape planning, as evidenced in the subtitle of the work, Das grüne Manifest (The Green Manifesto), and Die Wachsende Siedlung (The Growing Settlement) in 1932.

Leberecht Migge died of cancer in 1935 at Worpswede. His grave is preserved on the Worpswede Cemetery.

== Sources ==
- Collins, Christiane Crasemann. Review of Leberecht Migge, 1881–1935: Gartenkultur des 20.Jahrhunderts, edited by the Fachbereich Stadt-und Landschaftsplanung der Gesamthochschule Kassel. Journal of the Society of Architectural Historians 41:4 (December 1982) 358–359.
- Haney, David. “No House Building without Garden Building!” (“Kein Hausbau ohne Landbau!”): The Modern Landscapes of Leberecht Migge. Journal of Architectural Education 54:3 (February 2001) 149–157.
- Haney, David. When Modern was Green: Life and Work of Landscape Architect Leberecht Migge. London: New York: Routledge, 2010. ISBN 978-0415561396
- De Michelis, Marco. “The Green Revolution: Leberecht Migge and the Reform Garden in Modernist Germany.” In The Architecture of Western Gardens, edited by Monique Mosser and George Teyssot, 409–420.
- De Michelis, Marco. “The Red and the Green: Park and City in Weimar Germany.” Lotus 30 (1981): 105–118.
