= Rudolf Kortokraks =

German painter

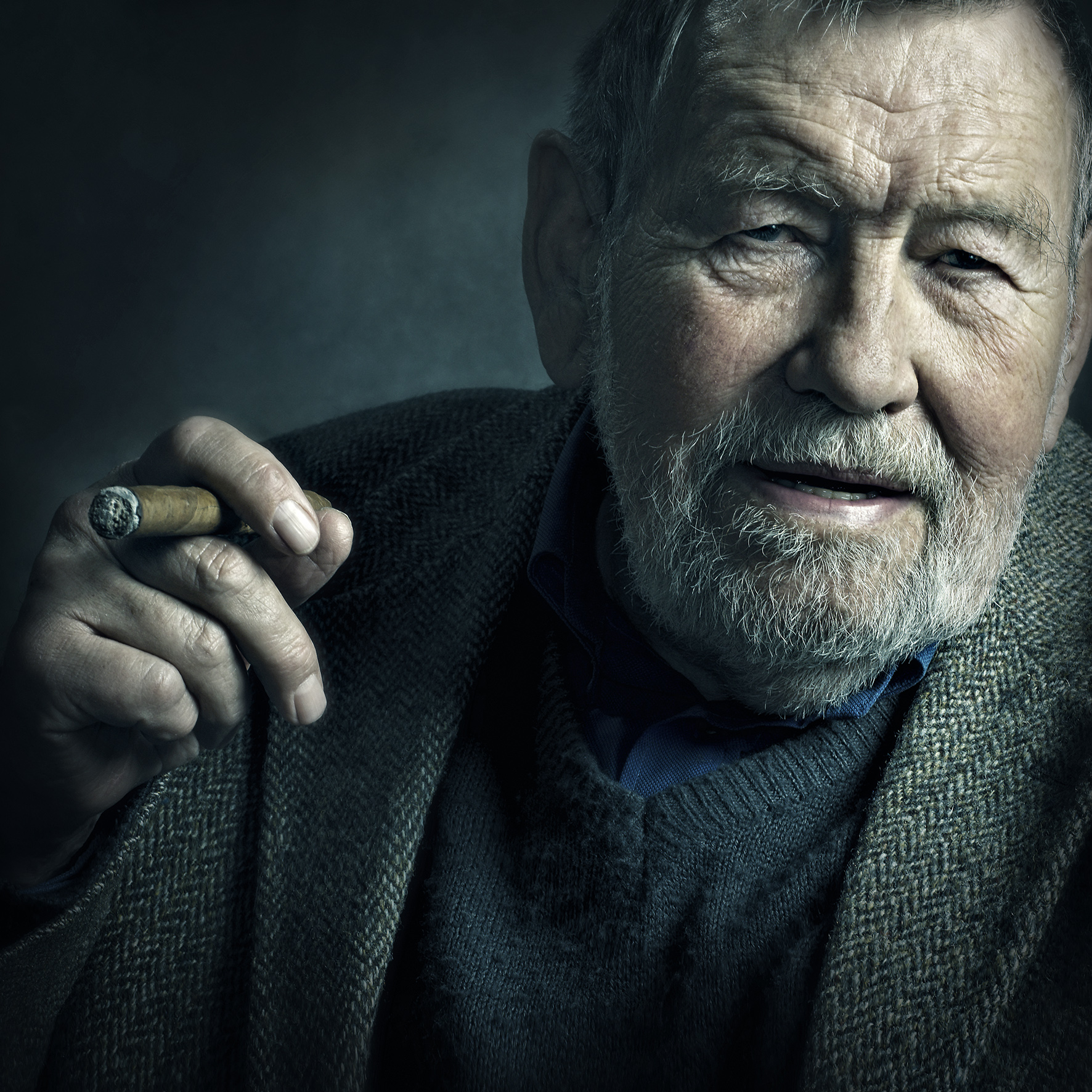
- Rudolf Kortokraks, 2005, by Stefan Zenzmaier
- Born: Rudolf Werner Kortokraks; 8 July 1928; Ludwigshafen, Germany
- Died: 11 September 2014 (aged 86); Hallein, Austria
- Known for: Painting

Rudolf Kortokraks (8 July 1928 – 11 September 2014) was a German painter from Ludwigshafen, Rhein. His paintings depict still life (particularly flowers), landscapes, cities and portraits. Kortokraks attended an art school in Graz in 1941, and moved to the Worpswede artist colony in 1949, where he first took part in exhibitions. He had his first one-man exhibition in 1951.

In 1954, Kortokraks joined the School of Vision, part of the international Summer Academy in Salzburg, as a teaching assistant to Oskar Kokoschka.

From 1956 until the collapse of the school in 1963, Kortokraks was Kokoschka's chief assistant at the School of Vision. Kokoschka granted Kortokraks the exclusive right to use the title "School of Vision". In 1951, thanks to a small grant, he moved to Paris. After travelling throughout liberated Europe and a failed marriage to Jutta Bilfinger, with whom he had a son in Germany, Kortokraks lived in north London with his second wife, Miriam Frank, from 1965 to 1985, when they separated amicably. He then moved to Tuscania, where he lived in a medieval tower. His final years were spent in the village of Kuchl, south of Salzburg.

Kortokraks had several exhibitions in Mexico and New York City in 1969. In 1976, he returned to the newly reformed School of Vision, in the Salzburg Summer Academy. In 1981, Kortokraks founded the School of Vision in Tuscania, Lazio, Italy.

In 2008 Kortokraks marked his eightieth birthday with a large exhibition in Salzburg.

In 2012 a documentary feature film about Kortokraks was released in Austria. In March 2013, mayor Heinz Schaden awarded him the gold seal of Salzburg. Kortokraks is considered "the last important representative of late Expressionism".

Kortokraks died on 11 September 2014 at the age of 86.

On 25 October 2017, twenty works by Kortokraks were stolen in Tuscania, Italy, following a retrospective exhibition. Among the stolen pictures (which can be seen here: http://www.tusciaweb.eu/archivio-gallery/le-opere-rubate-dellartista-kortokraks/) are two important works from the 1950s.
