= Clara Westhoff =

German sculptor (1878–1954)

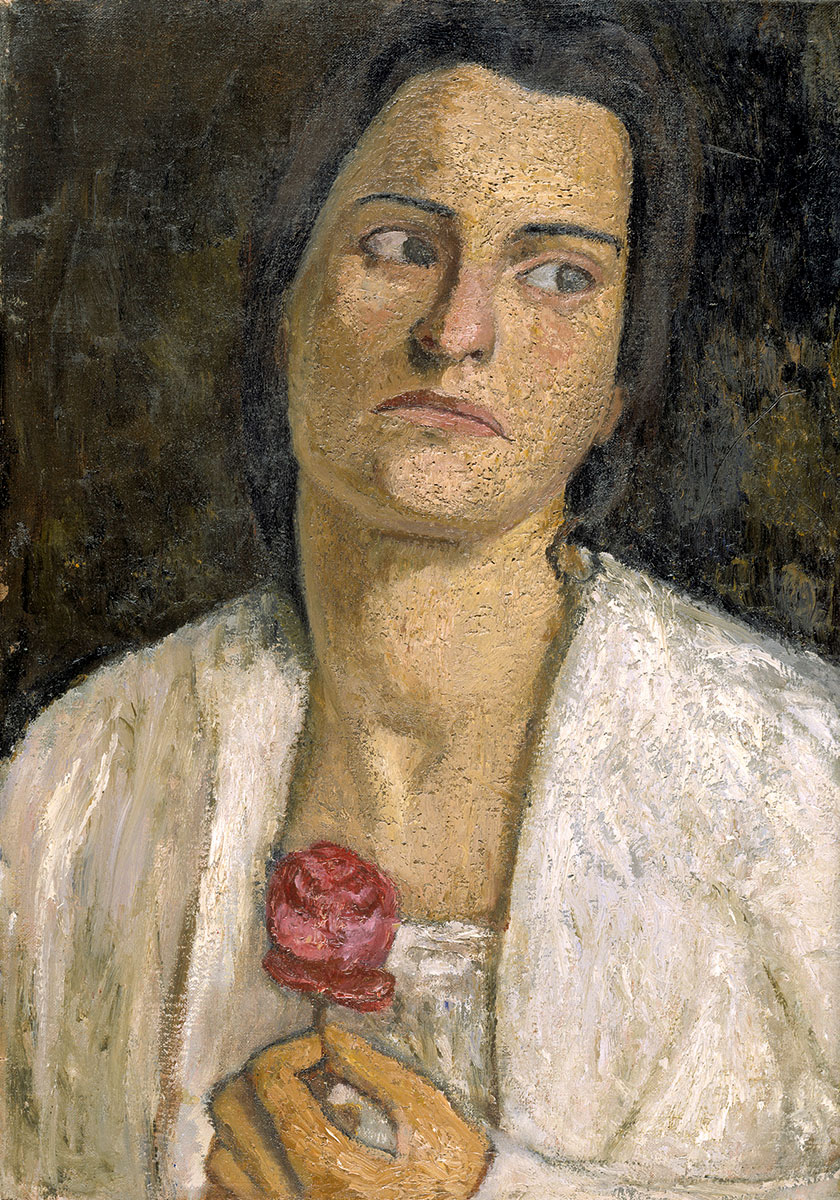
- Clara Westhoff, portrait by Paula Modersohn-Becker, 1905
- Born: 21 September 1878; Bremen, German Empire
- Died: 9 March 1954 (aged 75); Fischerhude, West Germany
- Education: Fritz Mackensen
- Known for: Sculpture
- Spouse: Rainer Maria Rilke (m. 1901; died 1926)
- Children: 1

Clara Henriette Sophie Westhoff (21 September 1878 – 9 March 1954), also known by her married name Clara Rilke or Clara Rilke-Westhoff was a pioneer German sculptor and artist.

== Early life and career ==
At 17, Westhoff went to Munich, where she attended a private art school. In 1898 she moved to Worpswede and learned sculpture with Fritz Mackensen. She befriended Paula Becker (later Modersohn-Becker) and Ottilie Reylaender, who were painters there. She continued her studies in 1899 with Carl Seffner and Max Klinger in Leipzig and, in 1900, trained with Auguste Rodin in Paris, also attending the Académie Colarossi.

By 1925 Westhoff had turned to painting so that, in addition to her sculptural work, she created an equally substantial body of work in painting.

== Personal life and death ==
In 1901 she married the poet Rainer Maria Rilke in Worpswede. Eighteen years later, she moved to Fischerhude with her daughter, Ruth Rilke. Her home there with a studio later became the "Café Rilke", which still exists. She died in Fischerhude on 9 March 1954.

== Legacy ==
Her work was privately owned or barely accessible to the public in various collections.

With her comprehensive biography in 1986, Marina Sauer initiated a rehabilitation of the artist by freeing Clara Rilke-Westhoff from being seen only as the wife of Rilke and as a friend of Paula Modersohn-Becker. Clara Rilke-Westhoff is a pioneer among women sculptors in Germany.
