= Hans am Ende =

German painter

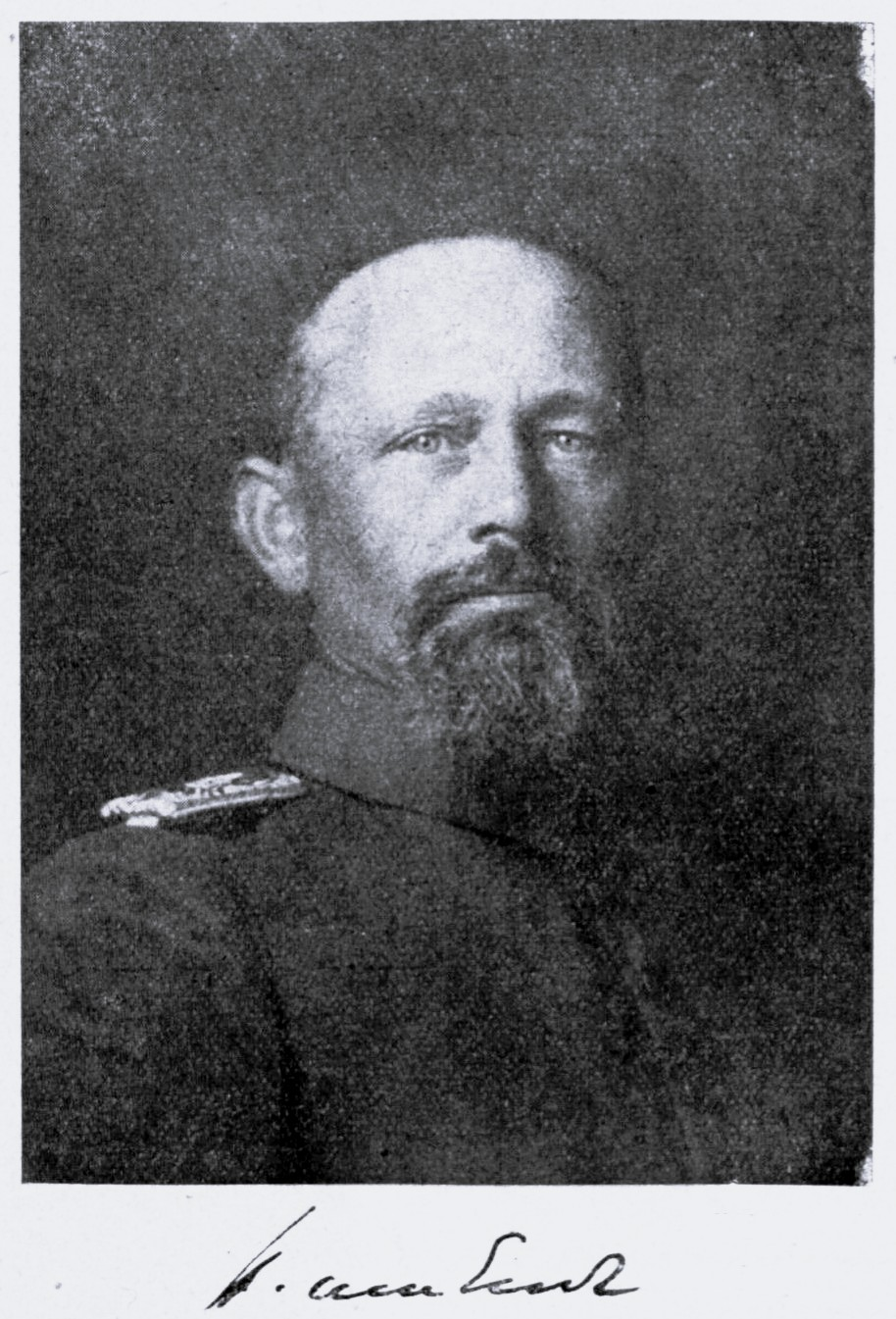
Hans am Ende during WWI

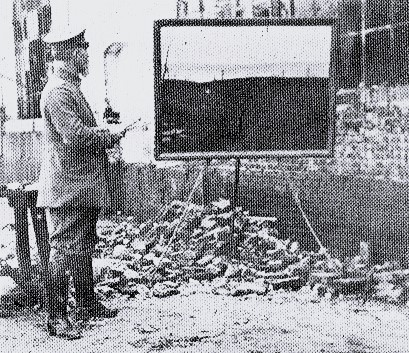
Hans am Ende painting during WWI

Leutnant Hans am Ende (31 December 1864 – 9 July 1918) was a German Impressionist painter.

He was born in Trier. In 1889 he co-founded the artists' colony in Worpswede with Fritz Overbeck, Otto Modersohn, and Heinrich Vogeler. In 1895 this group exhibited in the Kunsthalle Bremen and at the Glaspalast in Munich, which brought them national recognition. In 1900 the poet Rainer Maria Rilke travelled to Worpswede and befriended the artist's colony, eventually writing essays about each of its members.

Amongst his students at the Künstlerkolonie Worpswede was Anna Feldhusen, who was interested in Ende's skills in etching.

He volunteered for the army at the outbreak of the First World War, serving in an infantry regiment. On 10 April 1918 he was severely wounded near Mesen and taken to the hospital in Stettin, where he died. His grave is preserved in the Worpswede Cemetery.

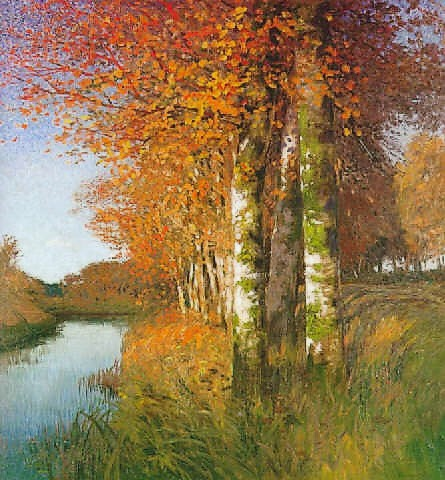
Birken am Moorgraben (1896)

== See also ==
- List of German painters
