= Fritz Overbeck =

German painter

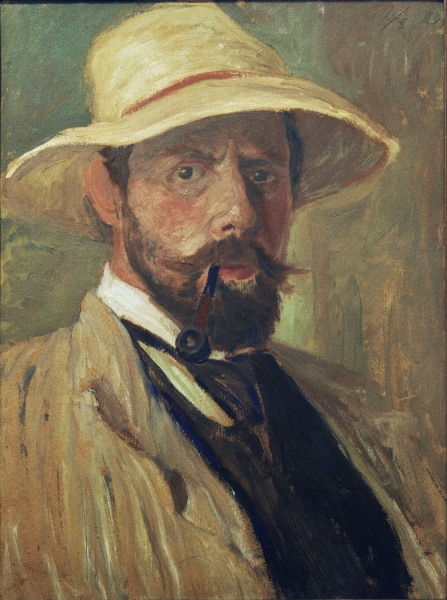
Self-portrait (c.1900)

August Friedrich Overbeck, known as Fritz (15 September 1869 – 8 June 1909) was a German painter and engraver.

== Biography ==
He was born in Bremen as the son of the Technical Director at Norddeutscher Lloyd. After graduating from the local Gymnasium, he attended the Kunstakademie Düsseldorf from 1889 to 1893. Among his teachers there were Eugen Dücker and Peter Janssen. In 1894, he was persuaded by Otto Modersohn to set up a studio at the Artists' Colony in Worpswede, where he became fascinated with painting the desolate moorlands.

In 1897, he married one of his students, Hermine Rohte, who had sought him out as a teacher after seeing an exhibition of his works at the Munich Glaspalast. She would also achieve some fame as a painter. Their son, Fritz Theodor Overbeck, was a noted botanist.

Around 1900, he became one of the many artists who were selected in a series of contests to design trading cards for the chocolate-maker Ludwig Stollwerck. In 1905, after Hermine was diagnosed with tuberculosis, he and his family moved to Vegesack, where he specialized in painting the beaches and sand dunes. He later became a member of the Deutscher Künstlerbund.

In 1909 he died, suddenly, from a stroke. He was buried at the Waller Friedhof in Bremen. Hermine survived her illness and devoted much of her time to promoting his work.

In 1990, his granddaughter Gertrud established the "Fritz and Hermine Overbeck Foundation", to preserve and publicize his work. In 2010, she was awarded the Order of Merit of the Federal Republic of Germany for her efforts.

== Overbeck's use of primary colors ==
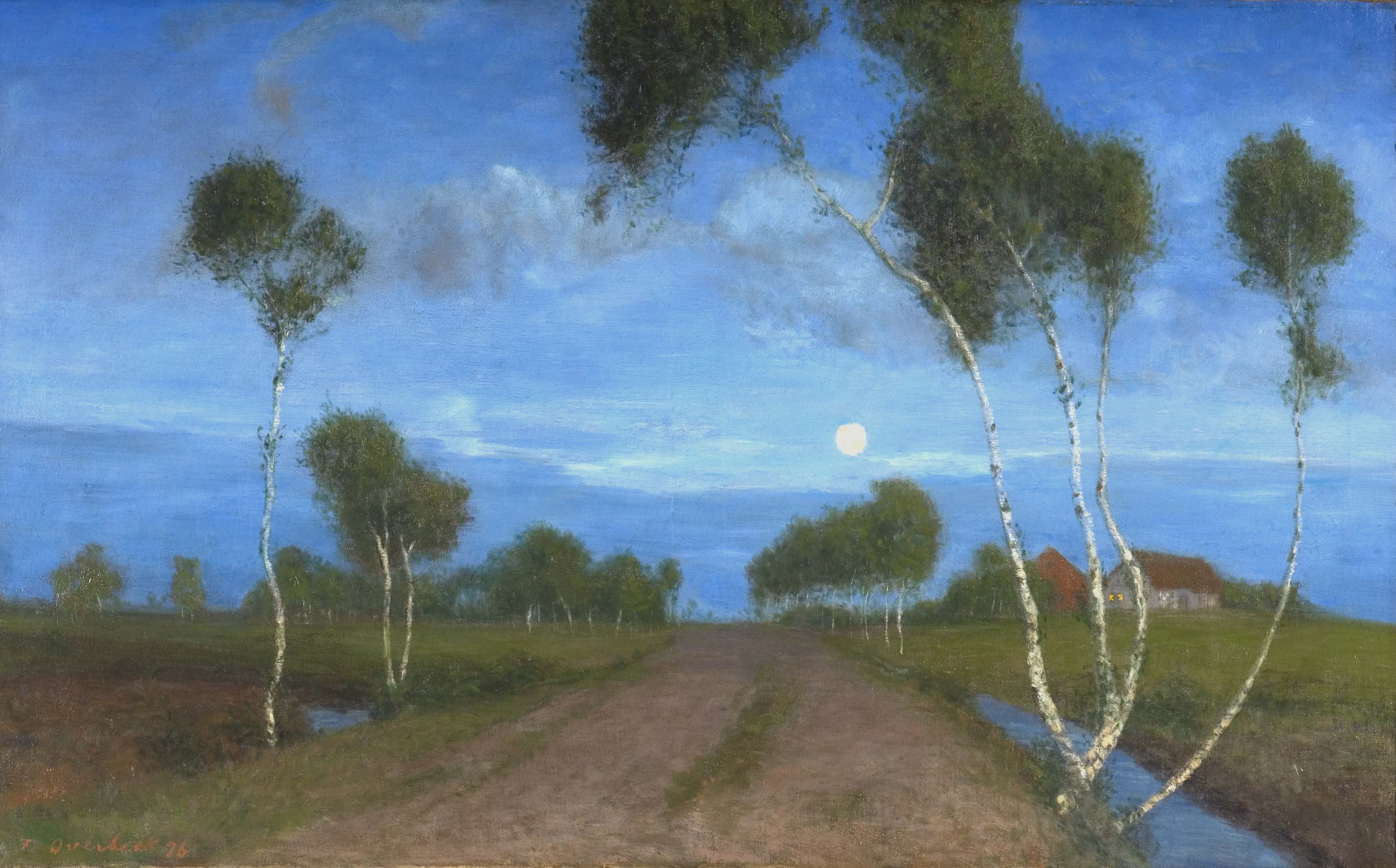
Evening in the Moor (1896)

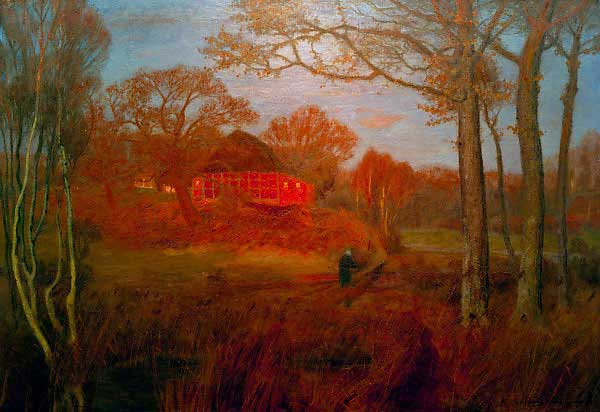
The Setting Sun (c.1900)

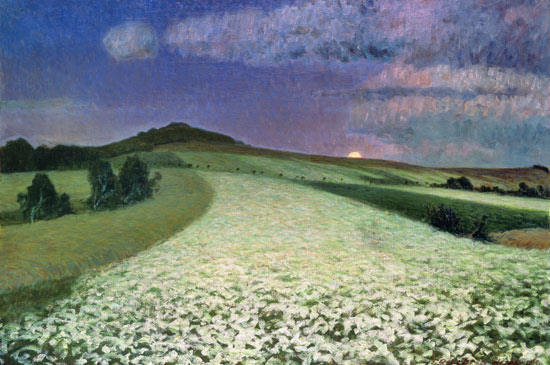
Flowering Buckwheat Field (c.1900)

== Writings ==
- Ein Brief aus Worpswede. in: Kunst für Alle XI (1895/96), S. 20–24.
