= Worpswede =

- Municipality
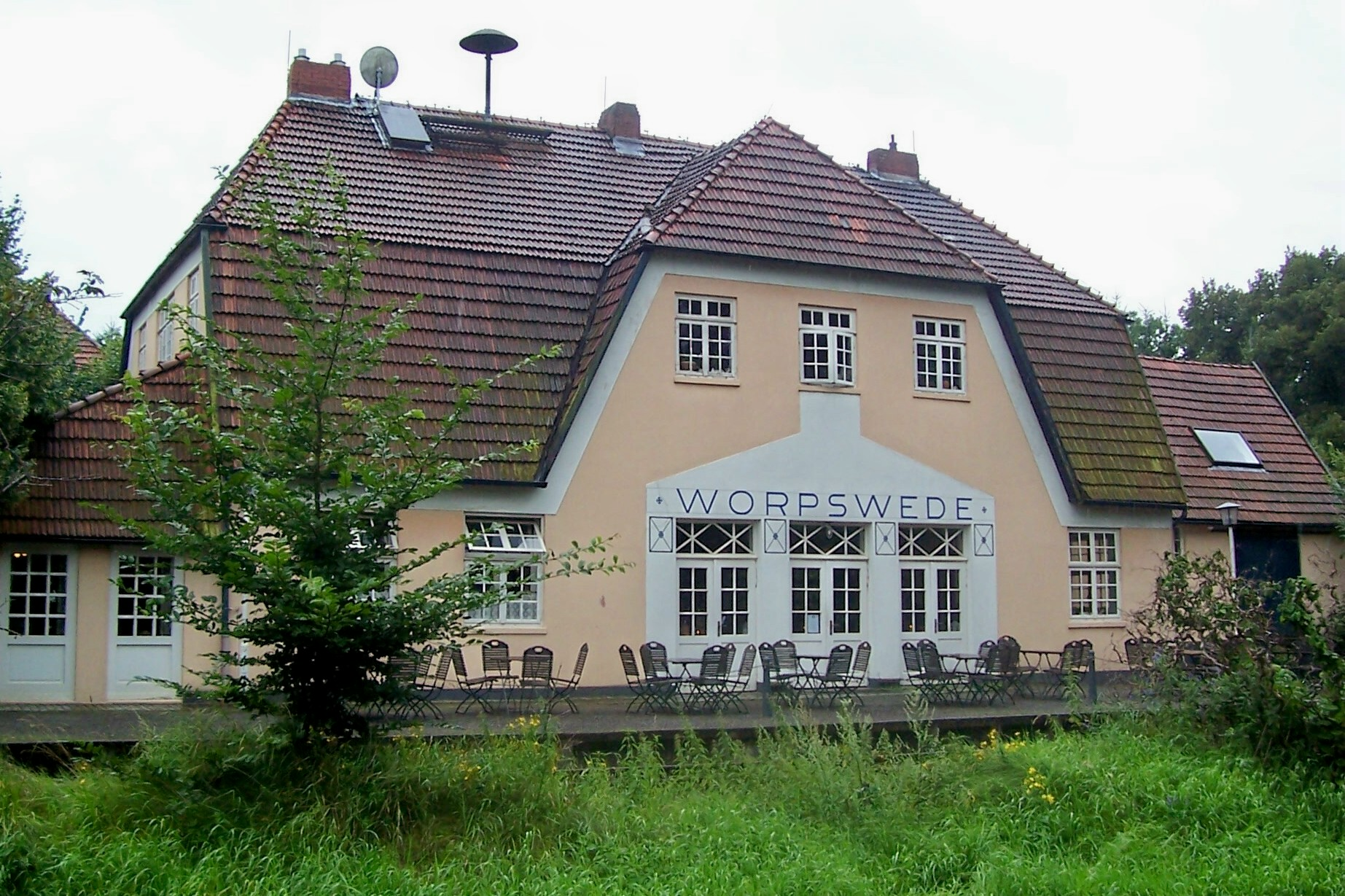
- Train station

- Coat of arms

- Location of Worpswede within Osterholz district
- Interactive map of Worpswede
- Location within Germany Location within Lower Saxony
- Coordinates: 53°13′20″N 08°55′40″E
- Country: Germany
- State: Lower Saxony
- District: Osterholz
- Subdivisions: 8 districts

Government
  - Mayor (2021–26): Stefan Schwenke (Ind.)

Area
  - Total: 76.38 km^{2} (29.49 sq mi)
- Elevation: 54 m (177 ft)

Population (2025-12-31)
  - Total: 9,237
  - Density: 120.9/km^{2} (313.2/sq mi)
- Time zone: UTC+01:00 (CET)
  - Summer (DST): UTC+02:00 (CEST)
- Postal codes: 27726
- Dialling codes: 04792 - 04794
- Vehicle registration: OHZ
- Website: www.worpswede.de

Worpswede (German pronunciation: [ˈvɔʁpsˌveːdə]; Low German: Worpsweed) is a municipality in the district of Osterholz, in Lower Saxony, Germany. It is situated in the Teufelsmoor, northeast of Bremen. The small town itself is located near the Weyerberg hill. It has been the home to an artistic community since the end of the 19th century.

== History ==
The origins of Worpswede date back to the Bronze Age. The first time it was mentioned however was in 1218. Then it belonged to the Prince-Archbishopric of Bremen.

In 1630 it was occupied by Sweden for a short period of time. In 1648 the Prince-Archbishopric was transformed into the Duchy of Bremen, which was first ruled in personal union by the Swedish and from 1715 on by the Hanoverian Crown. However, it took another 120 years (1750) until the colonization of the Teufelsmoor was started by Jürgen Christian Findorff by drainage of the bog. In 1823 the Duchy was abolished and its territory became part of the Stade Region.

== Church of Zion and cemetery ==
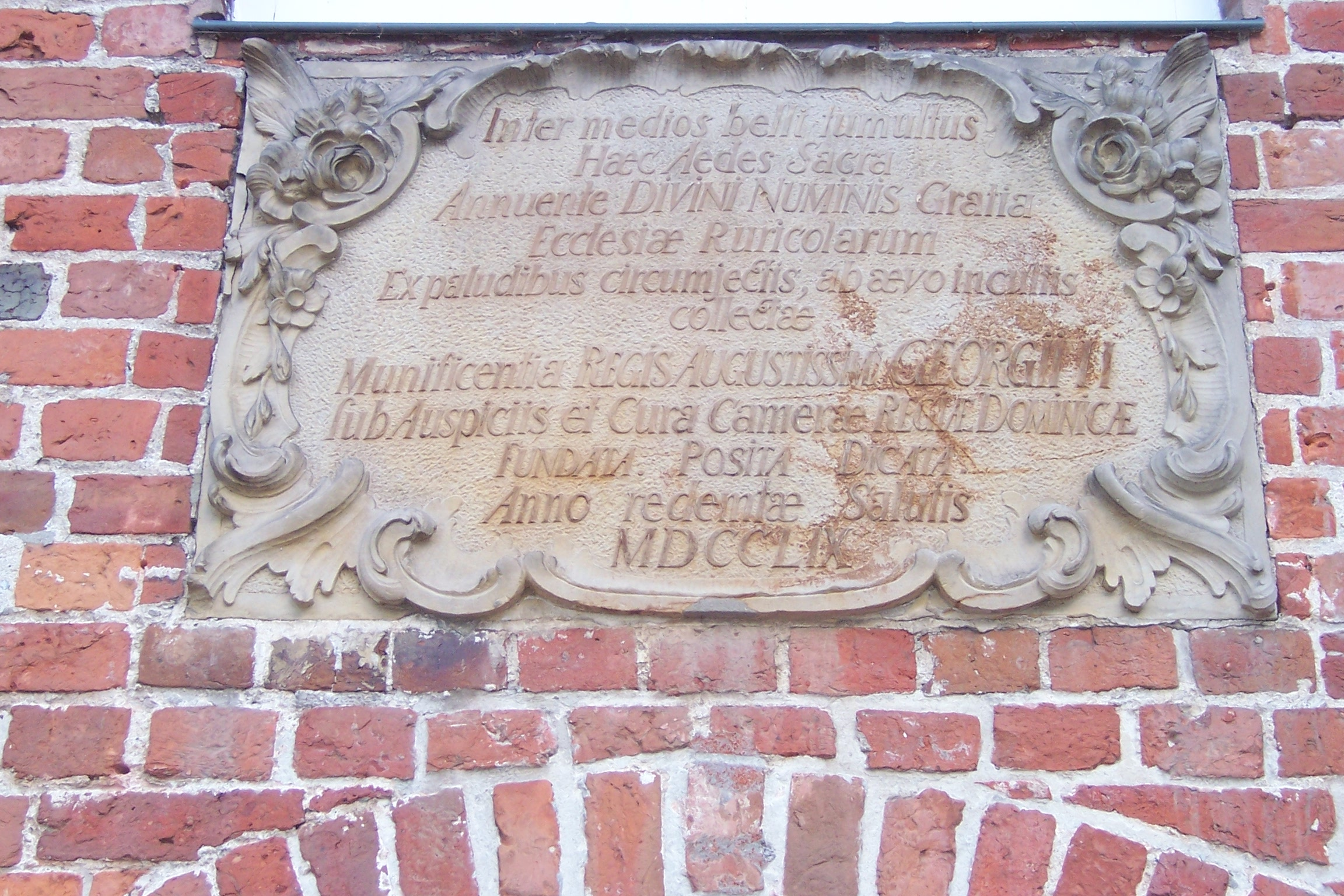
Plaque in Latin commemorating George II as principal of the Church of Zion building, hanging on its outside wall

Moor commissioner Jürgen Christian Findorff carried out the construction of Lutheran Church of Zion (German: Zionskirche), following the plans of Johann Paul Heumann, Hanoveran court architect of King and Elector George II Augustus of Great Britain and Hanover. The church was built between 1757 and 1759 during the wearisome Seven Years' War, which had its American version as the Anglo-French and Indian War.

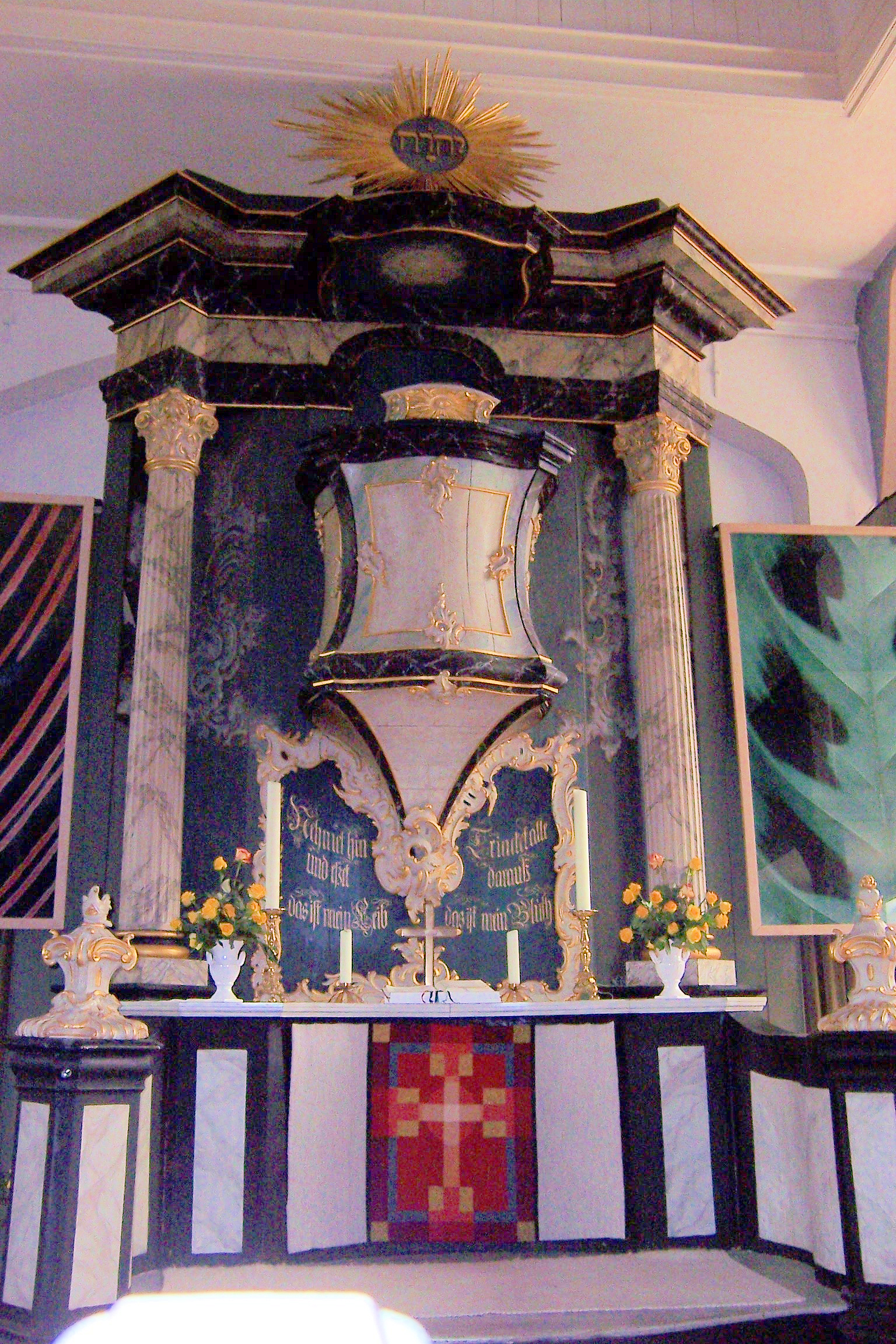
Church of Zion: Typical Protestant Kanzelaltar, topped by the Tetragrammaton of God's Hebrew name יהוה.

George II, being as summus episcopus the supreme governor of the Hanoveran Lutheran church, provided financial support for the construction of the Church of Zion. The hall church is oriented. Its else rather modest interior is beautified by a typical Protestant Kanzelaltar, combining pulpit and altar table, created in Rococo forms. It bears the Tetragrammaton יהוה in a top medaillon and to the left of the pulpit the king's ornamented initials GR (Georgius Rex, hidden on the photo by a painting).

There are heads of cherubim by Clara Westhoff and floral ornaments by Paula Modersohn-Becker at the pendentives and the columns, connecting to the ceiling. After in 1900 both artists, then still students, had rung the church bells for fun, which was generally understood as a fire alarm, they were fined. They could not pay and were allowed to perform instead by way of offering these decorative elements to the church. Lofts (or matronea) span between the outer walls and the columns.

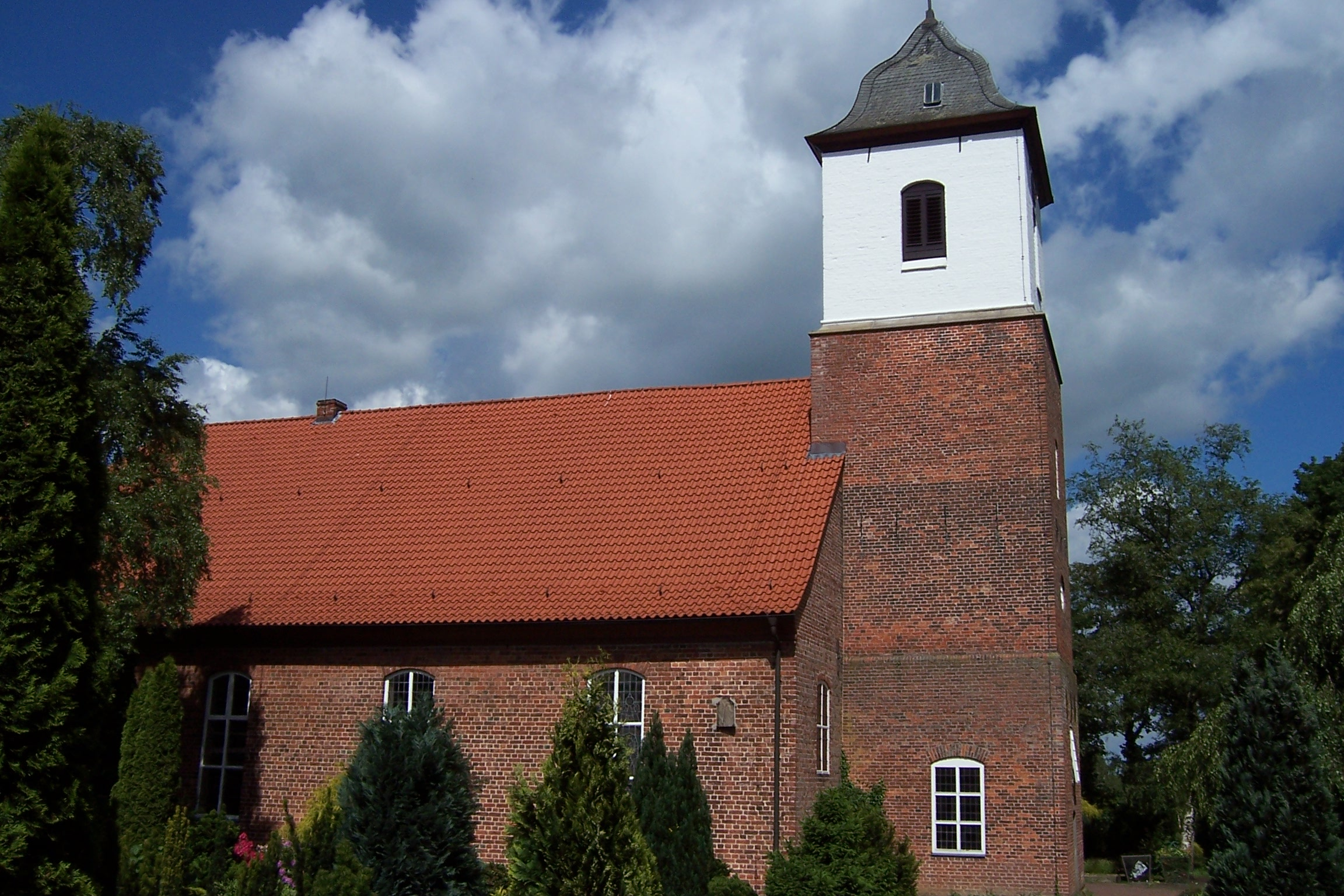
Church of Zion as seen from South

The church tower with its spire in baroque forms had been added at the eastern end of the actual church building only in 1798. The Church of Zion is located on the Weyerberg, and with its tower it is a landmark, often used as subject of paintings by the artists.

The cemetery is a churchyard, thus it actually spreads around the church building. It was designed after plans of Findorff and attracts many visitors because of its elevated location on Weyerberg and due to the graves preserved there. Among them those of 80 known painters, authors, musicians and artisans, such as Fritz Mackensen and Paula Modersohn-Becker.

== Culture ==
Worpswede is famous for its artists' colony, which dates to the last decades of the 19th century.

Today, about 130 artists and craftsmen and women live there permanently; though one should really include most of the inhabitants of Worpswede, since many are artists or have at least to do with any kind of arts. As an example, the owner of the small "Café Vernissage" also displays her paintings in the Café. There are a number of museums on life, art and crafts in Worpswede, such as the Barkenhoff, the Grosse Kunstschau, the Haus im Schluh, Worpsweder Kunsthalle, the Museum am Modersohn-Haus and the Torfschiffswerft Schlussdorf in Worpswede's outskirts.

=== Artistic community ===
In 1884 Mimi Stolte, the daughter of a shopkeeper in Worpswede, met Fritz Mackensen, a young student of arts, while she was staying with her aunt in Düsseldorf. Since he was destitute, she invited him to Worpswede to spend the holidays with her family.

In 1889 he settled in Worpswede, accompanied by other painters such as Hans am Ende and Otto Modersohn (who married Paula Becker), and followed by others such as Fritz Overbeck, Carl Vinnen, and Paula Becker. Other artists came, for example the writers and poets Gerhard Hauptmann, Thomas Mann, and Rainer Maria Rilke who was married to the sculptor Clara Westhoff.

Fritz Mackensen remained a good friend of Mimi Stolte's family to the end of his life. A memorial tablet created by Mackensen can be seen in front of the Kaufhaus Stolte.

=== Heinrich and Martha Vogeler ===
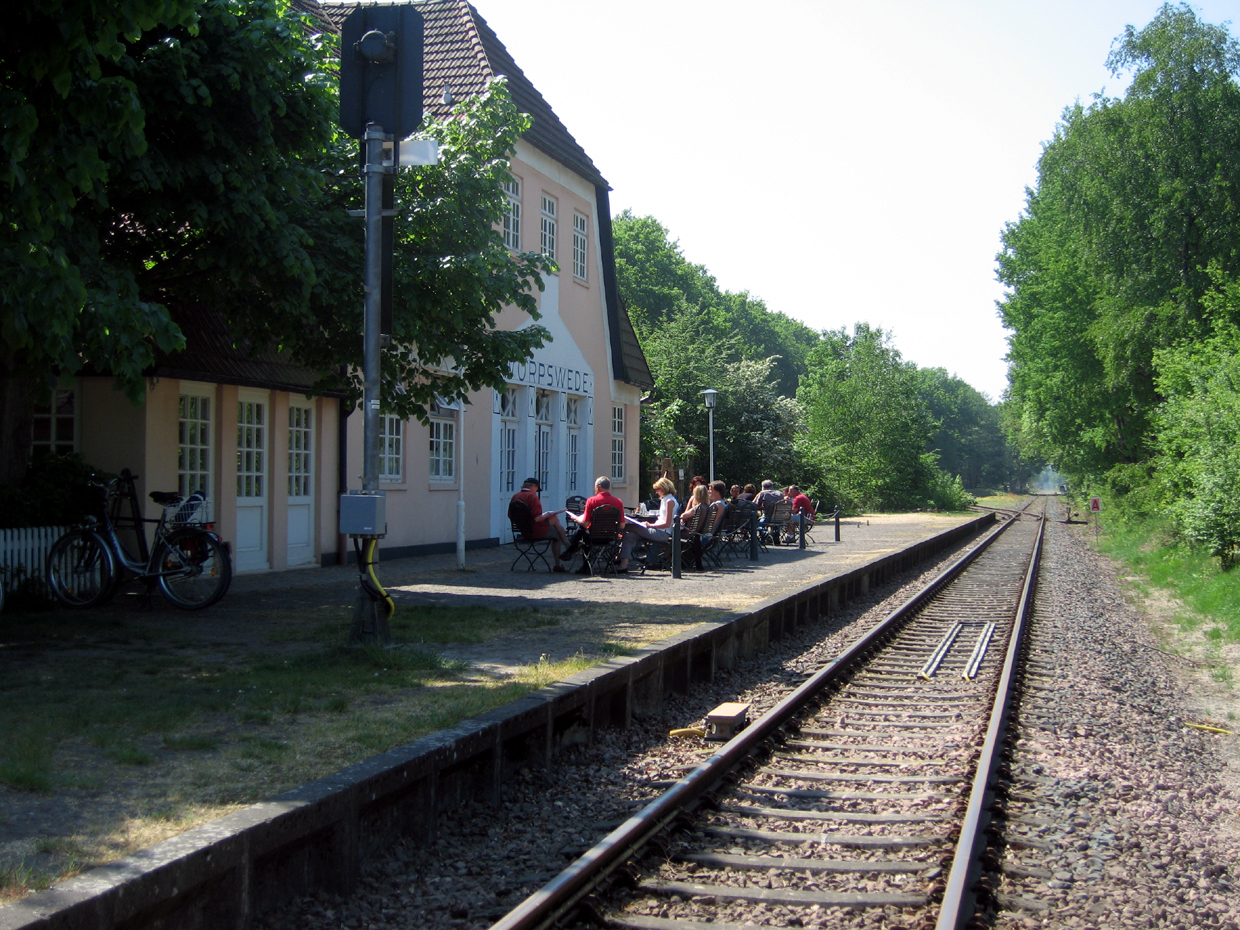
Worpswede railway station, 2007

In 1895 Heinrich Vogeler joined the first artists around Fritz Mackensen. He was not only a painter but also a draftsman, designer and architect. Since the growing industrialization made it necessary to find new ways of transporting goods and all sorts of materials, the idea came up to build a railway through the Teufelsmoor-area. So Vogeler was charged with the building of railway stations along the route. In 1910 the railway station at Worpswede was opened. It is the only railway station on the Osterholz-Scharmbeck - Bremervörde route still kept in its original "shape". Nowadays it is used as a restaurant.

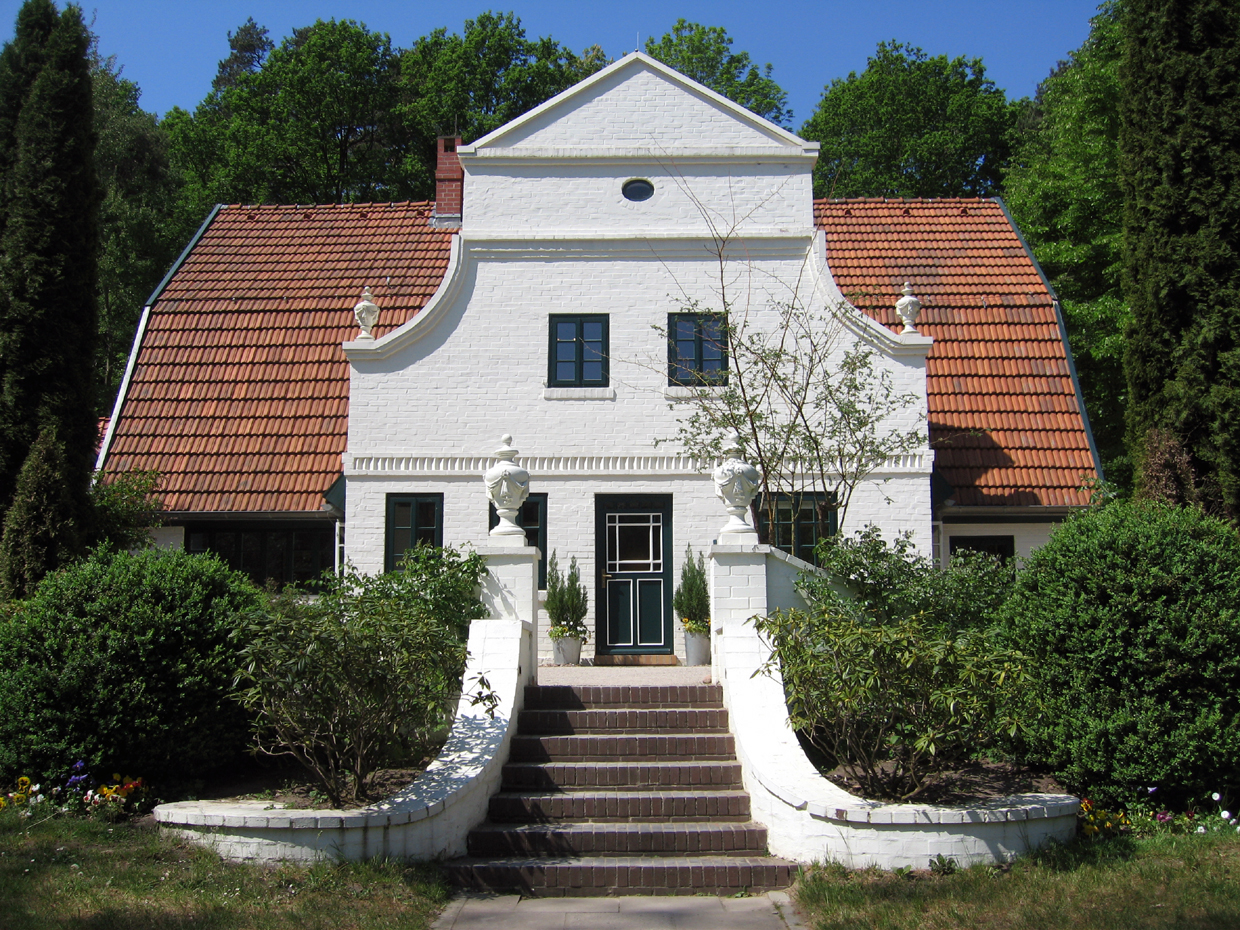
The “Barkenhoff” in Worpswede, 2007

In 1895 Vogeler bought a cottage and planted many birch trees around it, which gave the house its new name: Barkenhoff (Low German for Birkenhof, literally translated Birch-Tree-Cottage). It became the cultural centre of the artistic scene of Worpswede.

Vogeler's participation in World War I, in which Hans am Ende was killed, made Vogeler contemplate about life. As a result, he became a pacifist after the war had ended and joined the Communist Party of Germany (KPD). It was at that time that he and his wife Martha divorced. From that point on, he wanted to work from an ideological perspective. He left his former way of painting romantic scenes and started to make proletarian content the center of his work. In 1931 he emigrated to the Soviet Union and was deported in 1941 by Soviet authorities to Kazakhstan, where he died in 1942.

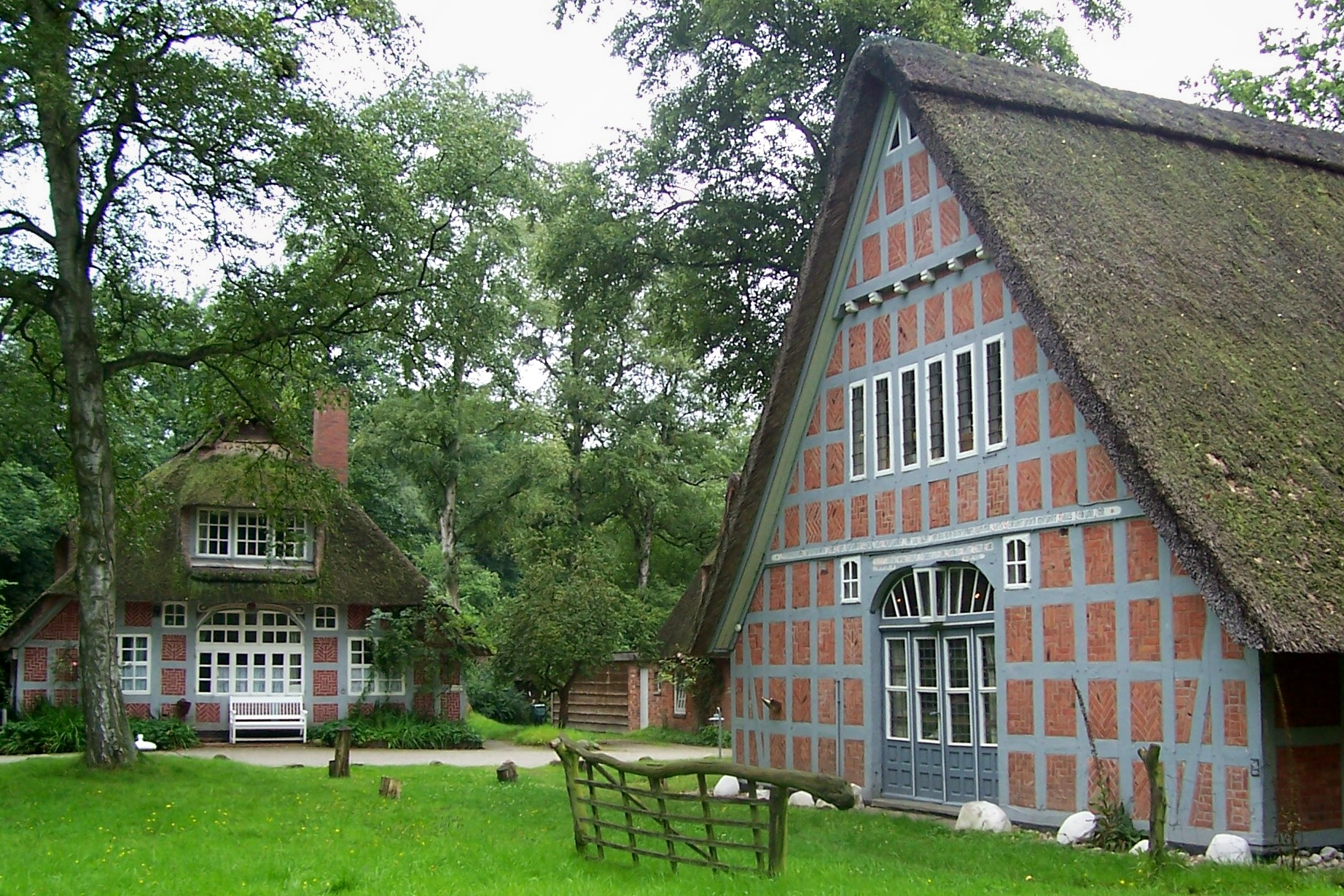
Das Haus im Schluh in Worpswede

Meanwhile, the Barkenhoff became a children's home. It was recently restored and has re-opened as a Heinrich Vogeler Museum in 2004. After their divorce, Vogeler's wife Martha built up her own childhood dream with the "Haus im Schluh". It still exists and belongs to the descendants of Martha and Heinrich Vogeler. As during the time of Martha herself, it contains a museum, a boarding-house, a weaving-mill, and offers different cultural events such as exhibitions, concerts of songs, etc.

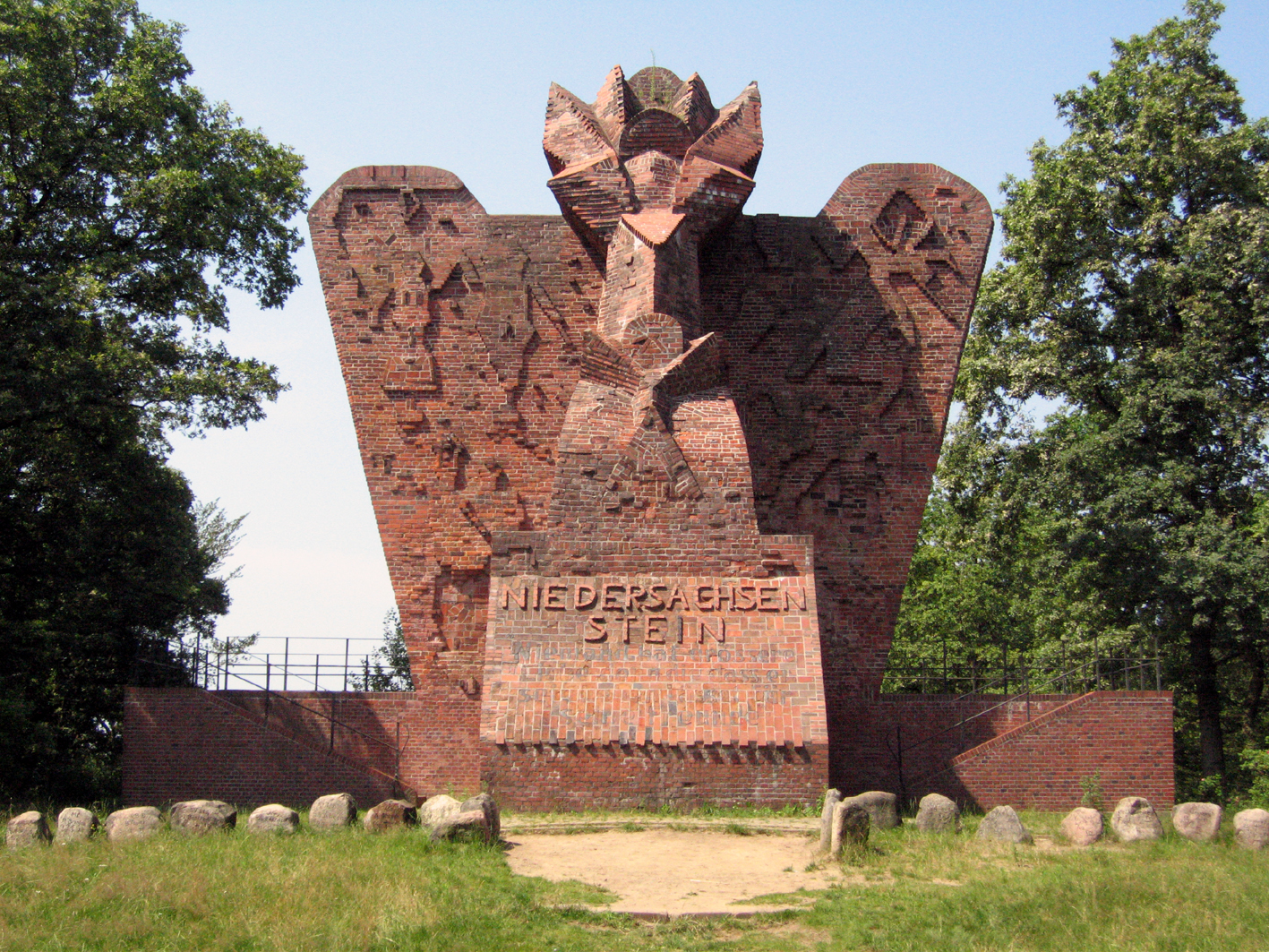
The “Niedersachsenstein” by Bernhard Hoetger

=== Second generation of artists ===
The first generation of artists was followed by a second one. The probably most important of them was Bernhard Hoetger, the creator of the Böttcherstraße in Bremen.

Like Vogeler he was a 'Jack-of-all-trades'. Many buildings in Worpswede have been built by him: examples include the Lower Saxony Stone (Niedersachsenstein), Kaffee Verrückt, Grosse Kunstschau and his own house Hinterm Berg. He also created many sculptures, such as the Bonze des Humors, the Träumende, Schlafende, Wut etc.

=== Worpsweder Käseglocke ===
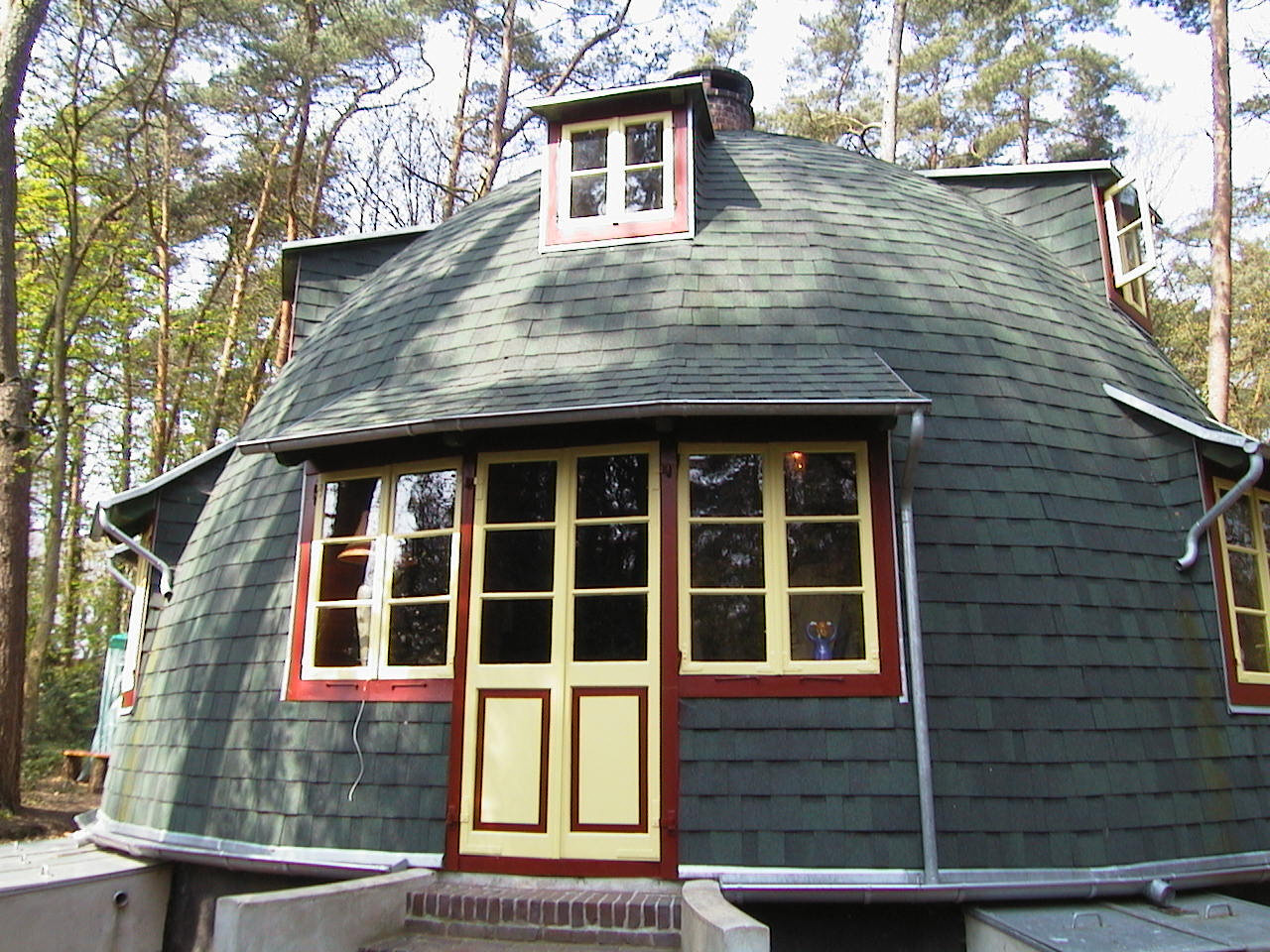
Worpsweder Käseglocke, created by the architect Bruno Taut in 1921 and built in 1926 by the writer Edwin Koenemann. This small structure was given its name because of its resemblance to a cheese cover. Since 2001 the Käseglocke has been used as a museum

Worpswede "Cheese Bell" (because of its resemblance to the bell-shaped glass cover conventionally used for cheese plates) is the colloquial term for a residential building located in the artists’ village of Worpswede in Lower Saxony. It was built by the writer Edwin Koenemann in 1926 following the architectural draft of Bruno Taut. Nowadays, the wooden house is under preservation and in the last couple of years has been fully renovated. The building, which caused quite a stir because of its unusual igloo shape, received the name "Cheese Bell" by the inhabitants of Worpswede.

Edwin Koenemann came to Worpswede as a young man in 1908 with the aim of becoming an artist. After failed attempts in different artistic genres he managed to get by as a tour guide. Today Koenemann is one of the most well-known citizens of Worpswede. His former home was reopened to the public on May 1, 2001. The story of Koenemann's posthumous fame started in the early 1920s. The architect Habich was based in Worpswede and worked closely with the German artist Bernhard Hoetger. Habich gave Koenemann, who was interested in expressionism, one particular edition of the Taut-magazine "Frühlicht" published in 1921/22. In the magazine, Koenemann came across the plans for a Taut-one-family-house, which was supposed to be built on the Central-German Exhibition in Magdeburg, yet the building was never built there. There was talk about a house with a cupola or the shape of an igloo, which at that point in time had never been built before.

The main idea for the igloo had already been expressed by Taut at the Deutscher Werkbund exhibition in 1914, inspired by the Glass Pavilion. The igloo belongs to a series of post-war experimental architectural trials at the beginning of the 1920s. Living in the igloo allows one to reside cosily whilst feeling protected. Architecture is devised as an organic form of nature without any décor or any applied academic rules. The Chimney of the igloo forms the main axis, around which the stairs wind up to individual chambers, similar in appearance to a snail shell. The Dormer windows look as though they have simply opened up out of the shell, thus making a concession to human use.

Koenemann, who also dabbled as an architect, recognised his opportunity in the draft which was only published in limited circulation. He took the rough sketches from the magazine "Frühlicht" and used them as direct templates for his own house on the Weyerberg in Worpswede. Koenemann's house, which he called “Glockenhaus” (the bell house), was completed in 1926. Koenemann and his appointed carpenter closely abided by Taut's specifications when constructing the outer façade. Only in detail were there changes made, such as both of the small windows next to the front door not being rectangular as in Taut's design, but rather triangular.

Inside, Koenemann designed a unique room layout. The central hall, which was arranged with an expressionistic mantelpiece composed from misfired pottery, became the principal position, while the living room was the central room in Taut's design. On the ground floor of the igloo, situated next to the hall and a small toilet, are the bedroom and the kitchen. Upstairs there are two tiny guest rooms and a generous studio room.

Comparable to the Hoetger-buildings, the “Cheese Bell” became an attraction of the artists’ village. During his lifetime the house was already known as a museum for an outsider. In the late 1920s, while Bruno Taut was working on the "Hufeisensiedlung" Britz in Berlin, he repeatedly visited the Worpswedian garden planner Leberecht Migge.

Long after Koenemann's death an art historian noticed Taut's drafts for “Frühlicht” and thereby discovered a building of Taut in Worpswede. The registered association “Freunde Worpswedes” (“Friends of Worpswede”) acquired the dilapidated building “Cheese Bell” from the estate of Koenmann's widow in 1994.

Koenmann's life and living environment is displayed inside the "Cheese Bell“. The original furniture did not remain intact, thus the association “Friends of Worpswede” presents not only traditional but also modern arts and crafts works, such as rustic furniture, chairs made by Bernhard Hoetger and cupboards made by Heinrich Vogeler, including an arms cupboard of the pacifist.

The garden, a disarrangement of wall fragments and grotto buildings, is also a draft of Koenemann, which is most likely inspired by Bernhard Hoetger. Currently, the construction is being restored to its original condition. Another project of the “Friends of Worpswede” on Koenmann's estate is the reconstruction of the guesthouse from the 1930s: a narrow ‘Nurdach’ house.

== Notable people ==
- Gerhart Hauptmann, playwright
- Rudolf Kortokraks, painter
- Fritz Mackensen, painter
- Thomas Mann, writer
- Paula Modersohn-Becker, painter
- Otto Modersohn, painter
- Rainer Maria Rilke, writer
- Heinrich Vogeler, painter
- Clara Westhoff, sculptor

== See also ==
- Art colonies
