= Plate (surname) =

Plate and Platé are surnames.

People bearing them include:

- Anna Plate (1871–1941), German painter
- Anton Plate (1950–2023), German composer
- Carl Plate (1909–1977), Australian painter
- Catya Plate, American filmmaker and artist
- Christina Plate (born 1965), German actress
- Enrico Platé (1909–1954), Swiss racing driver
- Harry Plate (1853–1939), German tinsmith
- Jeff Plate (born 1962), American drummer
- Johnny G. Plate (born 1956), Indonesian politician
- Ludwig Hermann Plate (1862–1937), German zoologist
- Peter Plate (born 1967), German musician and record producer
- Sebastian Plate (born 1979), German footballer
- Tom Plate (1944–2023), American journalist
