= Margarethe von Reinken =

German painter

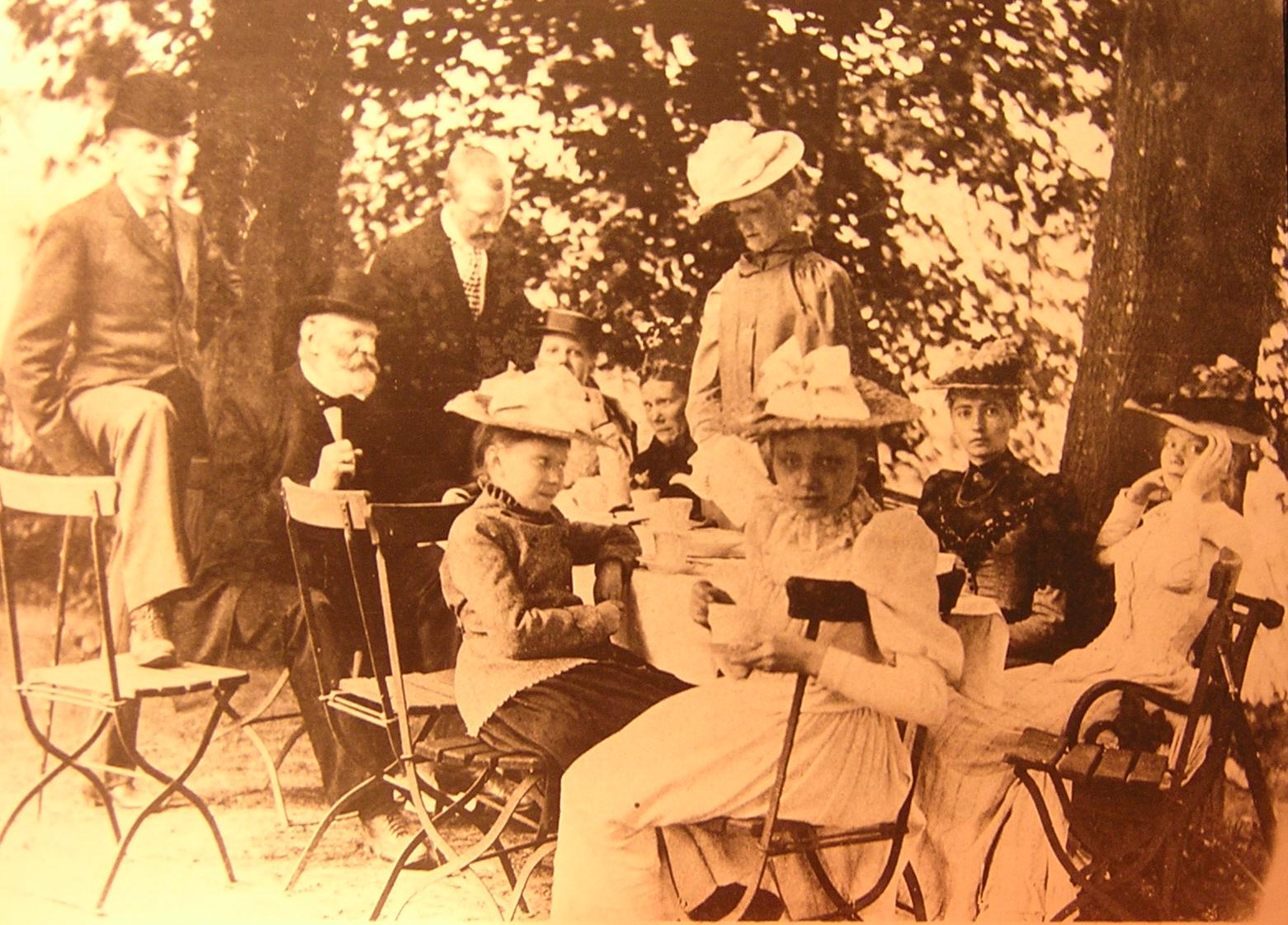
- Margarethe, front, looking into the camera with the von Reinken family, circa 1890
- Born: Margarethe Diederike von Reinken; 27 March 1877; Bremen, Germany
- Died: 8 April 1981 (aged 77); Bremen, German Federal Republic (West Germany)
- Occupation(s): artist (paintings and drawings) art teacher
- Parent: Daniel von Reinken (1831–1894)

Margarethe von Reinken (27 March 1877 - 20 January 1962) was a German painter. She was known chiefly for still lifes, landscapes and portraiture.

== Life ==
Margarethe Diederike von Reinken was born in Bremen, the youngest of her parents' eight children. Her father, Daniel von Reinken (1831–1894), came from a leading family of Bremen merchants.

While her father's business was still flourishing she was enrolled at the newly established so-called "Lady Artists' Academy" ("Malerinnenschule") in Karlsruhe, where she was taught by Friedrich Fehr and Ludwig Schmid-Reutte. She returned home to Bremen to launch herself as a freelance artist, setting up a studio at her widowed mother's house in the Feldstraße (loosely "Field Street"). She hoped to establish herself through contract work, focusing on portraits. Despite the acknowledged excellence of her draftsmanship and her good social contacts, she struggled financially at a time when the economy was undergoing a lengthy period of major structural dislocation. Around 1900 she also came into contact with the nearby Worpswede Artists' Colony. Her work was influenced members of it including Fritz Overbeck and Heinrich Vogeler. Several of her oil painted landscapes of nature and the countryside round Worpswede date from these early years of the twentieth century.

After the war her economic situation became more dire and she was no longer able to fall back on the family wealth, which was largely destroyed by the hyper-inflation of the period. With her elder sisters having married and set up their own homes, she was also, as the spinster daughter, expected to take care of her mother. Meanwhile, she remained in close contact with other local artists such as August Tolkien and Toni Elster with whom, in 1924, she staged a "collective" exhibition at the Bremen Kunsthalle art museum. Von Reinken was now also supplementing her income by teaching. Two of her pupils who later established significant artistic careers of their own were Agnes Sander-Plump and Gustava Thölken.

During the later 1920s she visited her elder sister Daniele, who had emigrated from Bremen to Brazil. In 1926 she painted several views of Rio and various mountain landscape sketches which are now in the possession of the family in São Paulo. Back in Bremen, in 1930 she was one of the very few women whose works were included at that year's GEDOK exhibition. Meanwhile she accepted the offer of friend to work for their family as a housekeeper. She kept the job for 17 years. She was able to use a room in the family home which she could use as a studio, but time available for painting was limited. She was nevertheless able to create a significant number of paintings for sale and exhibitions, her work included in a number of subsequent GEDOK exhibitions in Bremen, as a result of which her work remains represented in collections and galleries in and around Bremen.

In 1947 moved to a house owned by the Meta von Post Foundation in Bremen-Horn where she lived out her final fifteen years. A substantial retrospective exhibition of her work took place at the Bremen Kunsthalle art museum during the second quarter of 1994, featuring her paintings, water-colours and drawings. Günter Busch, director of the museum, paid tribute to her "perfect pitch" ("absolutes Gehör") in terms of colour and commended her "artistic sense of responsibility ... in respect of her critical self-appraisal". He added, "she did not allow her paintings to become superficial or frivolous. She tried to exclude from her art anything approximate or imprecise".
