= Hans Brasch =

German painter

- Born: 2 April 1882; Karlsruhe, Baden, Germany
- Died: 13 May 1973 (aged 91); Murrhardt, Baden-Württemberg, West Germany
- Occupations: Painter; Cartoonist
- Children: Helga Brasch-Schwenk

Hans Brasch (2 April 1882 – 13 May 1973) was a German expressionist painter. Since his death, his reputation has been based primarily on his portraits. Other favourite subjects included still lifes of flowers and landscapes featuring the hill country and forests of south-west Germany. Readers of the (by English standards rather mildly) satirical magazine Fliegende Blätter were also able to enjoy his line drawings during the early decades of the twentieth century.

== Life ==
Hans Brasch was born in Karlsruhe. He was one of four siblings, but the others were all girls. His father - another Johannes Brasch - was a painter and decorator who also produced stage sets for the city theatre and was in addition a talented amateur producer of his own works. His talents were acknowledged and appreciated in and around Karlsruhe. The father had very firmly held views about the path that his son's career should follow: little Hans should prepare to take over his father's business. The father would be disappointed.

He attended school locally and then moved on to the city's Applied Arts College ("Kunstgewerbeschule") - then a separate institution) which he attended between 1898 and 1900. In defiance of his father's wishes he then moved on to the Academy of Fine Arts ("Akademie der Bildenden Künste ") where he was a student between 1900 and 1906. His teachers included Ludwig Schmid-Reutte and Friedrich Fehr. Between 1904 and 1908 he was in addition picked out as a "Meisterschüler" of the Academy Director, Hans Thoma. Despite the amount of energy he seems to have devoted to fights with his strong-willed father over the direction of his career, by this time he had picked up a range of excellent technical skills, appropriate both to his father's business and to his own preference for a career as a "fine-arts" freelancer, which would stand him in good stead during his subsequent career. After 1908 he undertook his own intensive study of the "old masters", copying many of them in order to gather technical insights. During 1910 there was a brief but exceptionally important period during which he worked with the Geneva-based artist Ferdinand Hodler, with whom he undertook several painting trips in the mountains, followed by a study trip to Paris. There followed several years working successively in Mannheim, Heidelberg and on the shores of Lake Constance before he settled in 1913 to an established career as a free-lance artist in Frankfurt. He very quickly established himself as a sought after portrait artist and a respected painter more broadly.

War broke out in July 1914. Brasch spent the next four years serving in the army. When the nightmare ended he found it hard to resume his interrupted artistic development. Still in Frankfurt, he teamed up with August Babberger and Rudolf Gudden: the three shared a studio. Keen to recover his artistic momentum Brasch now turned to Goethe's Theory of Colours and the Anthroposophy of Rudolf Steiner. In 1920, with the help of Rudolf Gudden, he acquired an ancient farmstead at Urberg, a short distance beyond Sankt Blasien on the southern fringes of the Black Forest where he was able to progress his studies, while also intensively and exhaustively observing nature through the prisms of his newly acquired insights.

Till now the focus of Brasch's work had been on portraiture and oil paintings, but as the 1920s opened up he became, in addition, a painter of flowers, forests and hillscapes. He turned increasingly to watercolors, no doubt attracted by the relative portability of the necessary equipment and supplies when traipsing past hillside meadows, but also attracted by the atmosphere and textures possible with the medium, along with the more nimble use of colour which his works from the period demonstrate. His canvases from this period use only "Japanese" Washi paper, which facilitated the delicacy and precision associated with the artists' work. He continued to be relatively catholic in respect of modality and subject matter, however. One piece which resonated powerfully with contemporary art lovers and the wider public ever since is his 1925/26 mural construct for the unusual entrance hall (more recently deployed as a restaurant) at Bad Orb's remarkable railway station. He used the generous space availability to include a depiction of the seasons, of the thermal springs (from which presumably many of the train travellers had come to receive their cures) and of the townsfolk at their jobs and professions.

In 1930, Hans Brasch left the idyllic Black Forest countryside and returned to city life. The city in question, this time, was Stuttgart. During the 1930s he produced a number of large wall paintings and window glass images in public buildings. He also took a prominent part in the cultural life of Stuttgart. All this meant that he enjoyed a heightened public profile. At the start of 1933 the Hitler government took power and rapidly transformed Germany into a one-party dictatorship. There is little indication that Brasch had ever shown much interest in politics. Nevertheless, in 1937 the authorities declared that his art was "degenerate". Those of his works on display in public museums were confiscated and removed. He continued to work on perfecting his paintings, however, and exhibiting his works in non-public galleries both in Germany and abroad.

Hans Brasch died at Murrhardt, a short distance outside Stuttgart, on 13 May 1973, approximately six weeks after his ninety-first birthday.
