= Aegerter =

Aegerter is a surname that can be traced to the canton of Bern, Switzerland. People with this surname include:

- Daniel Aegerter, Swiss investor and entrepreneur
- Dominique Aegerter (born 1990), Swiss motorcycle racer
- Karl Aegerter (1888–1969), Swiss artist
- Mia Aegerter (born 1976), Swiss singer and actor
- Silvan Aegerter (born 1980), Swiss footballer
