= Toni Elster =

German painter

Meta Antonie "Toni" Elster (5 October 1861 – 15 December 1948) was a German painter. Her focus was on landscapes, and she painted many "harbour" paintings. As a young woman she traveled extensively, but the paintings for which she is chiefly remembered mostly show the north German flatlands of her home region.

== Biography ==
Toni Elster was born into an established Bremen merchant family. As a young woman she traveled extensively, notably in France, Italy, Spain and Switzerland. Those experiences left her with an enduring love both of nature and of art. She was evidently still unmarried when she fell seriously ill at the age of 36. Being still unmarried would have been regarded as unusual for middle class women of this generation, although for the generation born a couple of decades later the impact on the gender balance of wars in Africa (and elsewhere) would leave Germany, Britain, and other colonial powers each with a significant surplus of sometimes reluctant spinsters. It was at the age of 36 that Elster was confined to bed by a lengthy and serious illness, and it was only then that she reached the (also unconventional) decision that she should become an artist. On her recovery, in 1897 she relocated to Munich where she produced her early works which were mostly water colours. She also began to take lessons from the well regarded Munich-based landscape artist Fritz Baer (1850–1919). At some point during the later 1890s, after bringing her technique as a water colour artist up to standard, she took an extended trip to Scotland where she was able to work on her landscape painting technique with the young water colour painter, Glasgow-born John Terris (1865–1914). During and after this developmental phase the pattern was set. Elster produced numerous etchings, lithographs and, most notably, water colours depicting landscapes, often showing the same scenes at different times of day.

Back in Germany she made it her habit to work from her studio at Leopoldstraße 31 in Munich during the summers months, returning to Bremen during the winters. While in Bremen, and before heading south for the summer, she would spend the spring months as a member of the nearby Dötlingen Artists' Colony. She formed a particular friendship with another Bremen artist, Marie Stumpe. Stumpe lived more or less permanently at the "Dötlingen Colony" while her husband, a businessman, generally stayed in Bremen during weekdays, spending weekends with Stumpe and her fellow artists. Elster and Stumpe often explored the artistic possibilities of the area together, seeking out "landscape motifs" to sketch.

In 1904, during one of her summer stays in Bavaria, Elster became a member of the so-called Luitpold Group of artists which had been created a few years earlier by her mentor Fritz Baer to represent a younger generation of contemporary artists and strive to improve the quality of the artistic output being produced at that time. Later, between 1931 and 1937, Elster was supporting herself as an artist based at Richard-Wagner-Straße 3 in Bremen.

Elster died in Munich on 15 December 1948.

== Artistic approach ==
Elster's work employs a bold and muscular technique. The use of colour and the appreciation of light and shading suggest an appreciation of John Constable's landscapes. Rudolf Alexander Schröder identified a level of audacity reminiscent of Constable's work (ein "Constable gemahnenden Kühnheit"). Elster's harbour paintings, in particular, show off her own very distinctive style, the sense of space frequently emphasized with an "empty" foreground which sometimes extends far into the heart of the picture, evoking associations with photography or with Japanese woodcut images. Some of these same influences can also be inferred in Elster's over-emphasizing of contours, using black outlines. Her graphic power is even more evident in her charcoal drawings. And there is a heightened tension created in the contrast between linear grids overlaying the motifs and the more impressionist "floodlighting" effect with which it is combined. Other Elster paintings, such as "Der Sommertag" ("The Summer Day"), appear to owe more to Vincent van Gogh than to John Constable.

== Exhibitions ==
Elster exhibited in the Munich "Glaspalast" as early as 1900. From 1904, as a member of the Luitpold Group, she participated almost every year in their exhibitions in cities such as Berlin, Munich, Düsseldorf, Hannover, Hamburg, and Bremerhaven. Her debut in Bremen came in 1922 thanks to the "North-West Germany Art Association" ("Nordwestdeutsche Künstlerbund"). Two years later, her exhibits took a major part of city's spectacular Kunsthalle exhibition: almost all of the 22 Elster paintings on display found buyers. The last significant exhibition in which Elster's works featured while she was still alive took place in 1941 and was arranged to mark her eightieth birthday at the "Print Room" ("Graphische Kabinett") in Bremen, where her work had already been included in exhibitions on a number of earlier occasions. However, it would be more than another fifty years before a collection of her work would be presented in an exhibition. That rediscovery took place thanks to an exhibition organised in 1992 by the Overbeck Foundation. In 2011 her work was celebrated again in an extensive exhibition arranged by the Arts Foundation at Lilienthal (Bremen).

== Press ==
"They say Miss Elster is an old lady. If that is true, how is it possible that so much ability remained undiscovered for so long?" (Note: "Man sagt, Fräulein Elster sei eine ältere Dame. Wenn das wahr ist, wie war es denn möglich, dass so viel Können so lange verborgen blieb?") The newspaper report that opened with this question reflects the warm reception that Elster's work received at the 1924 Kunsthalle exhibition. It was perhaps no more than a reflection of the attitudes common in those times that another enthusiastic critic, after commending her paintings for their "well judged line", the frugal and clever "economy of her handiwork" and a talent that bore comparison with a "thoroughly male artistry and balance". Went on to compare her (favourably) only with three female artists: Paula Modersohn-Becker, Anna Plate and Clara Rilke-Westhoff.

== Legacy ==
Most of Toni Elster's work, which includes various large format canvas print, is today in private hands, and not readily accessible to scholars or critics. But some of the pictures have found their way into the Bremen Kunsthalle collection, the "Print Room" ("Graphische Kabinett") and the Focke Museum (both also in Bremen). Further afield, the State Museum for Art and Cultural History in Oldenburg holds and normally has on display two characteristic Elster paintings: "Kutter im Hafen" and "Moorlandschaft (Schneeschmelze)" ("Cutters in harbour" and "Moorland landscape under melting snow"). These both demonstrate her talent. One commentator, enthusiastically commending both paintings, added that they were typical of her work both in terms of composition and of subject matter. He nevertheless thought it nothing shorts of astonishing that she had discovered the harbours as a recurring theme. At that time, a woman of Elster's social background would not normally be expected to turn up unchaperoned with an easel in the Bremen harbour district. But Elster's interest in the many aspects of the maritime scene more than outweighed any conventional scruples. The various artistic testimonies that she created of her wanderings among the warehouses, sheds and cargo ship form a portfolio of swiftly completed and confidently contoured charcoal drawings that express Elster's artistic temperament with stark clarity. She commanded a formidable level of graphic craftsmanship which then found its way into her paintings when she returned to her studio, and added in her own unique impressionistic flavour.
