= Agnes Sander-Plump =

German painter (1888–1980)

- Born: 1 May 1888
- Died: 23 December 1980; Lilienthal (Bremen), West Germany
- Occupations: Artist (portraits & landscapes)
- Spouse: F Sander
- Children: 3, including Ursula Sander-Lohmann (1911–1978) and Hanna Sander-Lutz (born 1913)
- Parent(s): Hermann Plump; Agnes Melchers

Agnes Sander-Plump (born Agnes Plump: 1 May 1888 – 23 December 1980) was a German painter. She was a member of the "Worpswede artists' colony".

== Biography ==
One of six siblings, Agnes Plump grew up in Bremen where, it was said, the Plumps had lived for ten generations. The family were well connected. Later she became godmother to Karl Carstens, a leading national politician during the 1960s–80s. Hermann Plump, her father, was a grain merchant who had wanted to be a painter himself. Agnes Plump's talent for drawing was picked out during her first school years. She received her first art lessons from the Bremen artist Margarethe von Reinken. During 1907 and 1908 she attended the Bremen Arts Academy where she was enrolled in portraiture classes with Walter Magnussen (1869–1946).

In 1909 Agnes Plump married the tobacco merchant F.Sander. The marriage did not last long, but by the time it was over the couple had produced three children which stimulated their mother to concentrate more on portraiture. Later the two daughters, Ursula Sander-Lohmann (1911–1978) and Hanna Sander-Lutz (born 1913), both followed their mother's career choice and became painters.

Around 1910 Agnes Sander-Plump got to know Max Beckmann, Hans Meid and Wilhelm Gerstel in Berlin, which encouraged her to pursue her artistic inclinations. However, war intervened in 1914. In 1919 she returned to Berlin in order to study with Lovis Corinth. Then in 1924 she undertook a lengthy trip to Paris with Minne Beckmann, Max Beckmann's (first) wife, whose marriage was coming to an end. In 1926 she relocated to the "artists' colony" at Worpswede, where for the next few years she concentrated on portraits of children.

In 1936 she painted a life-sized portrait of herself, standing before an easel. In this striking work, which can almost be described as "abstract", the face is only faintly discernible, implied through a contrast between light and dark. It was a courageous approach which stood in stark contrast to the prevailing artistic approach called for by the Nazi precepts of the time.

In 1964 the regional government of Lower Saxony awarded her the Cross of merit with the following citation:

- Agnes Sander-Pump is one of those artists who has satisfied humanity's yearning for beauty, harmony and well-being.
- Agnes Sander-Plump gehört zu den Kunstschaffenden, die das Sehnen der Menschheit nach Schönheit, Harmonie und Wohlklang befriedigt haben.

== Work ==
A large number of portraits of children form the core of her surviving legacy. They are a testimony to her artistic skills, and express an unusual depth of contact between artist and subject. Her pictures of people cover an age range from infants through to young people and adults. One of her portraits is of Lisel Oppel. There are also still lifes featuring dolls and a few landscapes. Her realistic reproductions feature a high level of technical skill, well defined outlines, well-conceived depiction of surfaces and insightful use of colour.

== Books ==
Agnes Sander-Plump published two children's books:

- 1949 "Geheimnis der Kinder" ("Children's secret")
- 1980 "Doris, Kinderjahre in einer Hansestadt 1893-1900" ("Doris: childhood years in ... [Bremen] ... 1893-1900")

The second of these included around 40 drawings which she had produced during the 1960s, illustrating memories of a carefree childhood.
