= Anna Plate =

German painter (1871–1941)

Anna Plate (26 August 1871 - 23 July 1941) was a German painter. She was a prolific creator of still lifes, watercolor flower paintings, street scenes and portraits.

== Biography ==
Anna Plate was born in Bremen. Her father was a judge.

Her artistic training began during the 1890s. She studied in Bremen with Kunz Meyer und Gottfried Hofer. There followed a couple of years in Munich where she was taught by Ludwig Schmid-Reutte. In 1897 she moved on again, this time to Paris where she enrolled at the independent academy run by the sculptor Filippo Colarossi. The focus of her study in Paris involved the systematic copying of works by three leading masters of impressionism, Courbet, Manet and Renoir. Critics of the period identified clear marks of their influence in Plate's subsequent works. During the years that followed she would undertake further study trips to France.

In 1919 Plate became a member of the "Bremer Malerinnen Verein" ("Bremen women artists' association"). (The "Künstlerverein" - "Artists Association" - set up in Bremen in 1856 would remain a "men only" association till 1928.) After the "Bremer Malerinnen Verein" was dissolved she became a member of the pan-German "Gemeinschaft Deutscher und Oesterreichischer Künstlerinnenvereine aller Kunstgattungen" ("Association of German and Austrian Women Artists for all types of art") which had been set up from Hamburg by Ida Dehmel.

Anna Plate's reputation grew through the early decades of the twentieth century. The young but already well-respected gallery-director and critic Emil Waldmann wrote in 1920 of her "masterful confident ability [and] expert hand, able to create a masterpiece from the simplest of themes.... [It] would be easy to place, Manet, Courbet and Renoir ahead of her when it comes to still lifes. And [Plate herself] would be the first to acknowledge cheerfully the debt that she owes to these masters. But that does not detract from the way in which she has cultivated her own approach. One the basis of her exceptional proficiency and technical insights she opens up a fresh vigour with her feeling for nature. There is an appetite for her subject, a sureness of touch in her appreciation of the light and shade and of the noble physical appeal of the surfaces. These qualities are rarely encountered in German art".

In 1925 Anna Plate left Bremen and made her new home in Dresden, far to the south and to the east in Saxony, where Anna Plate would live out the final sixteen years of her life. Sources are silent as to what prompted the move. She became a member of the Dresden Artists Association ("Künstlerbund Dresden") and of the "Dresdner Kunstgenossenschaft". She also became part of the Loschwitz [artists'] circle.

Between 1922 and 1943 Anna Plate exhibited her work regularly at the Graphisches Kabinett and at the Kunsthalle in Bremen. In 1931 a sixtieth birthday exhibition of her work was presented at Dresden-Loschwitz. It nevertheless appears that after her move to Dresden in 1925 she never found the widespread appreciation of her work with critics and art-buyers that she had built up in Bremen. Her popularity in Bremen continued throughout her life, even after the move to Dresden. Following her death a further exhibition to celebrate her life and works was presented at the Graphisches Kabinett.

== Works ==
Numerous still lifes, watercolor flower paintings, street scenes and portraits continue to bear testimony to the scale and continuing appeal of Anna Plate's artistic output. In her home city, the Bremen Kunsthalle permanent collection contains one of her flower still lifes, her painting "Vorstadthäuser" ("Suburban Houses") and several watercolors. The Kommunale Galerie in Bremen holds a still life in oils by Plate. The Focke Museum holds a number of her pictures including two portraits, both dating from around 1910, of "Adele Wolde" and "Malvina Elisabeth Schütte", along with her "Straße in Vegesack", a late and slightly unrepresentative oil painting which comes across as a rather academic and precise work, emplpying light impasto shades.

=== Output (selection) ===
- Adele Wolde. Porträt, farbige Kreide, um 1910, im Focke-Museum
- Malvina Elisabeth Schütte. Porträt. Öl auf Leinwand, um 1910, im Focke-Museum
- Pfirsichstilleben. Öl auf Leinwand, um 1910
- Blumenstilleben. Öl auf Leinwand, vor 1911
- Blumenstrauß. Öl auf Leinwand, 1915
- Hinter dem Bremer Theater. Öl auf Leinwand, vor 1919
- Beschauliche Straße. (Vegesack?), Öl auf Pappe, 1921
- Vorstadthäuser. Öl auf Leinwand, um 1930, in der Kunsthalle Bremen
- Stilleben, Katerfrühstück. Öl auf Leinwand, 1936
- Straße in Vegesack. Öl auf Leinwand, 1941, Bremen, im Focke-Museum
- Stilleben mit Früchten und Flaschen. Öl auf Leinwand, o. J.
- Fleischstilleben. Öl auf Leinwand, o. J.
