= Wilhelm Hempfing =

German painter

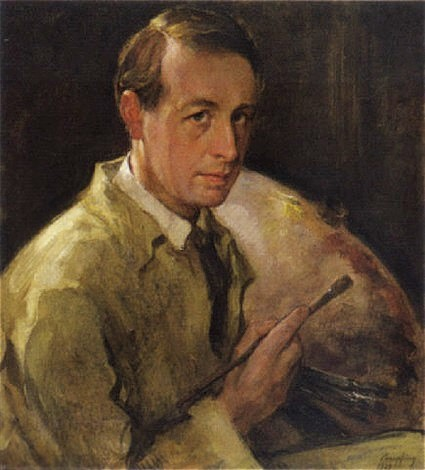
Self-portrait with Palette (1929)

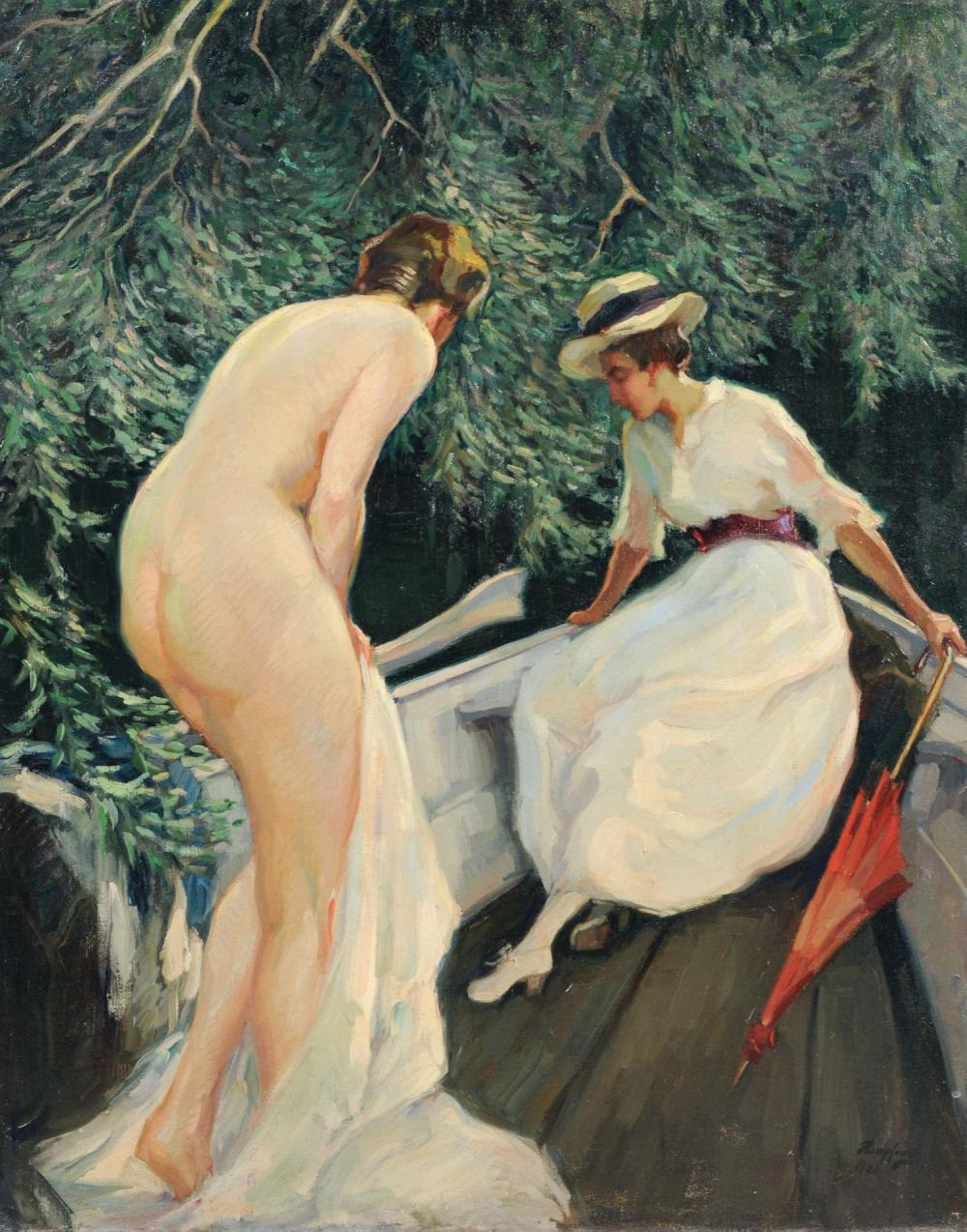
Bathing Party (1924)

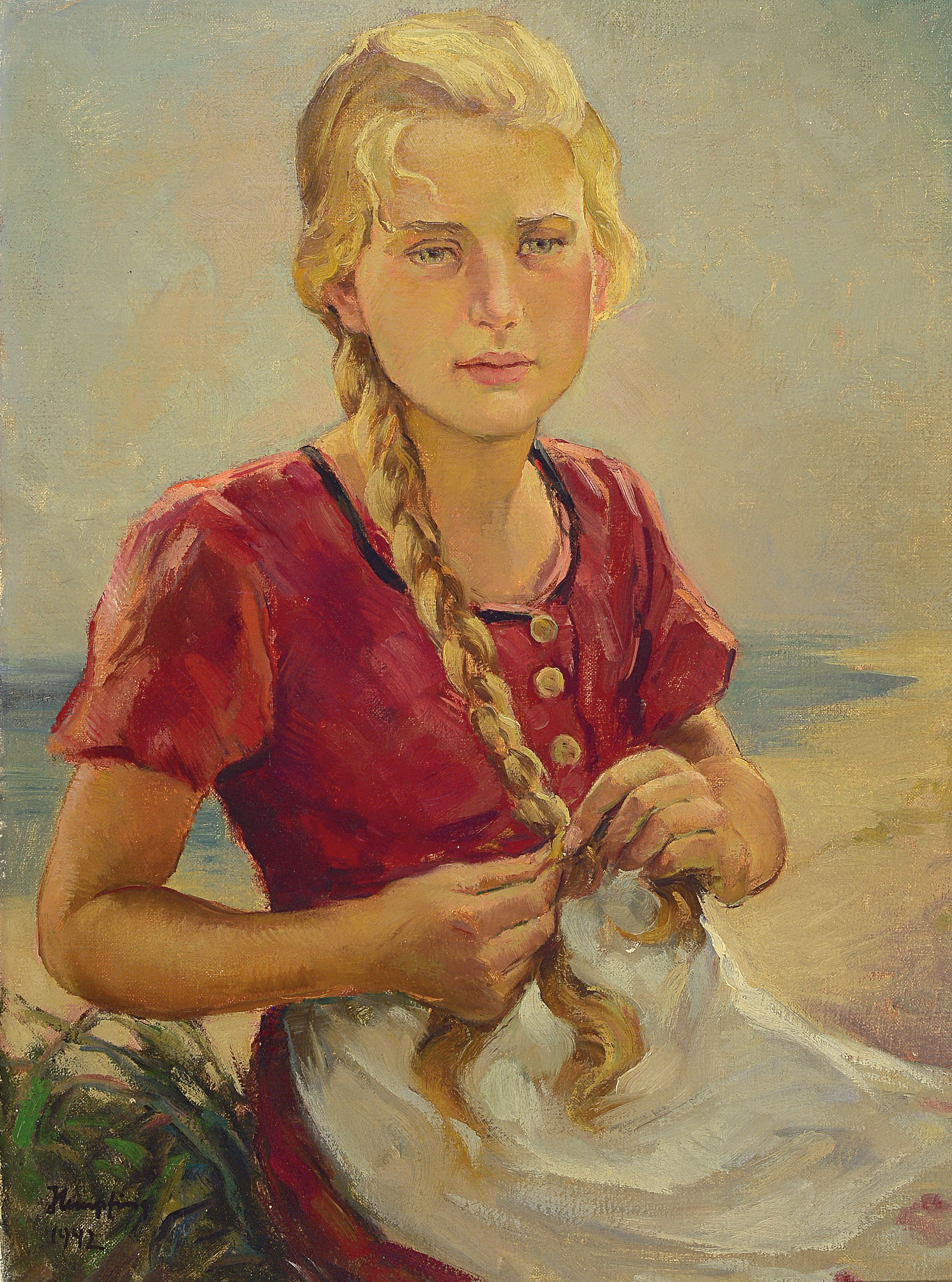
Girl on Beach

Wilhelm Hempfing (15 July 1886 – 6 June 1948) was a German painter and printmaker.

== Life and work ==
He was born in Schönau. He was a master student at the Kunstakademie Karlsruhe, where he studied with Friedrich Fehr. He also learned etching and printmaking techniques from Walter Conz. After completing his studies, he travelled extensively, to Italy, Spain, France, England and North Africa.

He was given "Special Importance" under the Nazi regime so, between 1937 and 1944, he had several exhibitions at the Große Deutsche Kunstausstellung in the Haus der Kunst in Munich. At least one of his works is known to have been purchased by Hitler, the nude "Sitzende Blondine" (Sitting Blonde), which bore a striking resemblance to Eva Braun.

In addition to his government sponsored exhibitions, he had showings throughout Germany, in Vienna, and in Zürich. His works consist mostly of landscapes and nudes, with a few portraits and still-lifes of flowers. He also produced a large quantity of etchings, influenced by Conz, and was a book designer.

Hempfing died in Karlsruhe in 1948.
