= Karl Aegerter =

Swiss artist (1888–1969)

- Born: 16 March 1888; Bern, Switzerland
- Died: 12 May 1969 (aged 81); Basel, Switzerland
- Occupation: Swiss artist

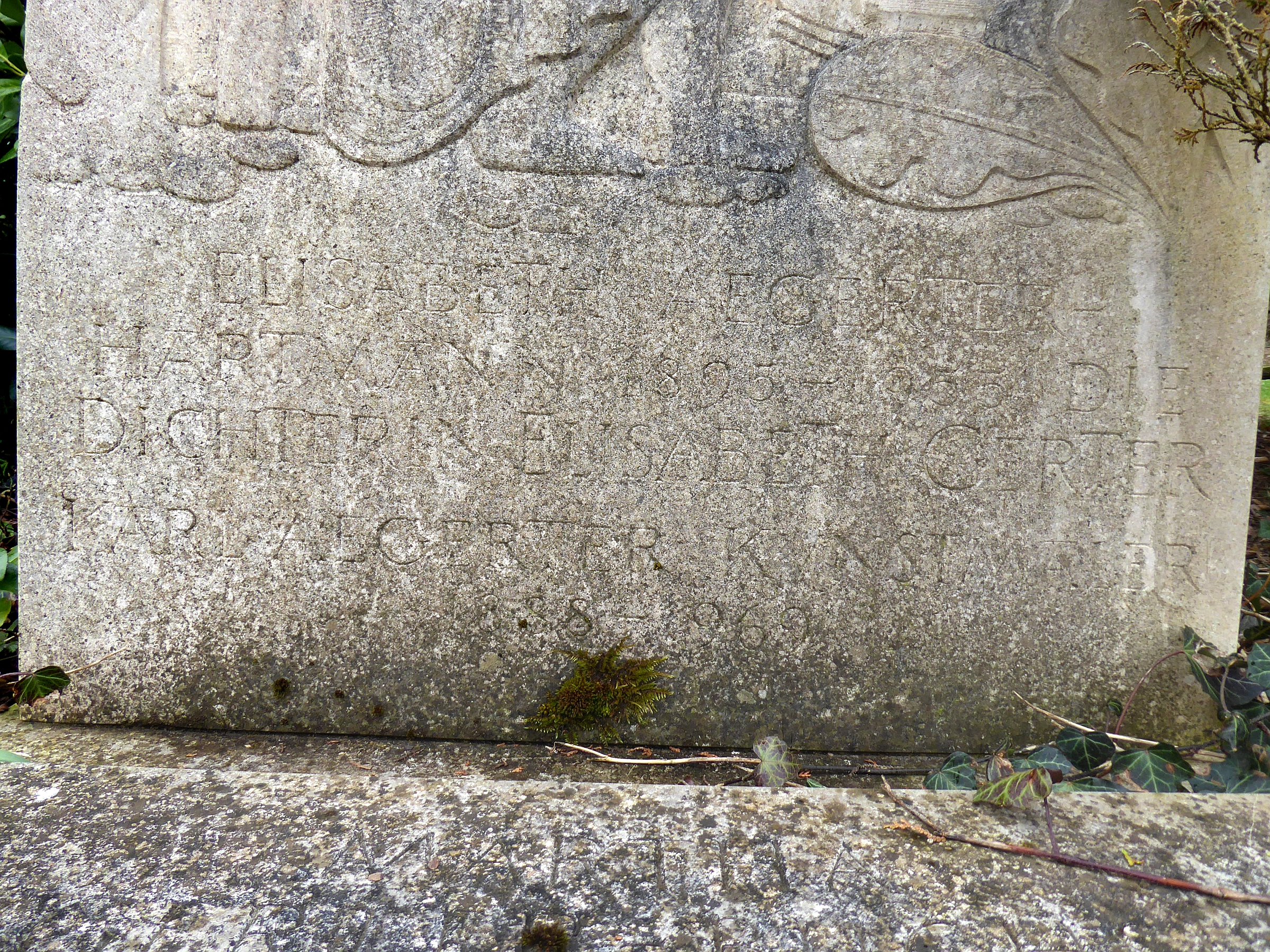
Karl Aegerter-Hartmann (1888–1969) socially critical painter, fresco, woodcut, politician, grave at the cemetery Hörnli, Riehen, Basel-Stadt

Karl Aegerter (16 March 1888 – 12 May 1969) was a prolific Swiss painter, draftsman, etcher, muralist, illustrator, designer and sculptor. Now in numerous private and public collections, Aegerter's works are often likened to those of Edvard Munch.

== Childhood ==
At the age of seven, young Karl was given up as a “Verdingbub” (foster child), a common practice in an impoverished Switzerland at the time, as struggling farmers gave up their children to urban foster families for a given period of time. During this time, Karl's older brother and role model, August Samuel Aegerter (Basel 17 October 1878 Basel – I June 1971, Basel), established himself in Basel as an artist, inspiring the young Karl.

== Studies and influence ==
During his basic schooling, Aegerter worked in factories and construction sites before beginning an apprenticeship as a decorative painter in the 'Fabriken und auf den Bau'. At the age of 27, having saved enough money, Aegerter left Basel to begin his studies in Munich, walking the 400-kilometer distance from Basel to Munich, where he enrolled to study drawing in the private art academy run by Heinrich Knirr. The Knirr Academy is also known for having schooled other Swiss artists such as Paul Klee and Ernst Morgenthaler. From 1915 to 1919 he continued his studies at the Kunstakademie München, In 1924, Aegerter had to leave Munich for health reasons and moved to the Engadin. In 1926, he returned to Basel.

== European travels ==
Thereafter, Aegerter undertook several long journeys: in 1923–1924 to Vienna and Budapest, 1924–1925 to Berlin, Dresden and throughout Saxony; in 1927 to Rome, Italy, having received a stipend from Basler “öffentlichen Kunstsammlung”, the City of Basel’s official art collection. He continued in 1927 to Brussels and in 1928 to Paris. Aegerter also began around this time his lifelong relation with the high alpine region of Switzerland, Graubünden/Grisons. He took a medical retreat in 1924 in the region of St. Moritz, doing so again in 1940–43, and returned again in 1945, having received yet another stipend from the City of Basel to complete a "Study of Graubünden", dedicating himself to landscape painting.

== Back to Basel ==
Having established his domicile in Basel in the late 1920s, Aegerter became a fixture in the city's thriving and highly political art scene. It was around this time that Aegerter's political engagement intensified, and he joined the Communist Party. In 1926 he met the Basel poet Elisabeth Gerter (Aegerter) (née Elisabeth Hartmann (1895–1955)), who after their marriage in 1930, wrote under her adopted pseudonym Elisabeth (Ae)Gerter. Gerter was a journalist, poet and story writer of the “Social Realism” school. Karl often illustrated her works, many of which were published to great acclaim in Switzerland and are still in print today.

In 1926, Aegerter left aside his artistic activity for a full-time engagement in politics to become the Party Secretary of the Swiss Communist Party in Basel (KP Basel). This continued through the 1930s until the banning of the Party in Switzerland, after which time his political affiliation moved to the Socialist Party (SP). From 1932 to 1941 Aegerter served as an elected official in the City Council of Basel. From 1948, he served additionally as a Judge. During the same time he served for many years as president of the Basel Section of the Swiss Painter & Architects Guild (Gesellschaft Schweizerischer Maler, Bildhauer und Architekten (GSMBA)), founded in 1865 as the first and most powerful artists’ association of Switzerland at the time. After the Second World War, Aegerter and his wife spent long periods in the Belgian coal mining town of Borinage, completing a full series of paintings showing the suffering of the workers. Borinage itself had already been made famous in the 1934 silent film of Joris Ivens, “Misere au Borinage”; in the paintings of Henry Luyten of the 1860s of the great strikes of the time; and for being the home town of Vincent van Gogh.

In 1955, after long illness, Elizabeth Gerter died. Later that year, Aegerter married for a second time, this time Marta Buchser.

In 1962, an extensive catalog of Aegerter's works appeared, under the title "Gestalter des Humanen (Designer of Humane), which included a lengthy foreword of texts prepared from colleagues and professional acquaintances. Public recognition of the artist evolved from one major exhibition to another: 1959 in Basel; 1968 in Schloss Arbon; 1980 in Muttenz; 1987 in St-Ursanne; and 1996 in St. Moritz in the Galleria Curtins. Karl Aegerter died on 5 December 1969 in Basel.

== Works ==
Karl Aegerter's prolific artistic career emerged as a painter, sketcher, muralist, illustrator, sculptor and designer. His first major series of paintings, entitled "People of Today" (Menschen von Heute), came forth in the 1920s and focused on the themes of poverty and suffering in the aftermath of the First World War. Other central themes seen in his work related to industrial & mining subjects as well as alpine landscapes, still lives and portraiture.

During his prolific career, Aegerter experimented with numerous styles, influenced by the various forces at work on the artistic scene, never truly belonging to any one "school".

Following in the line of German Expressionism, and following on the First World War, Aegerter chose those who had been marginalized by society the central focus of his work. The working class milieu and the mining communities were at the forefront of his themes. Aegerter had experienced the resulting misery of war first hand and painted this in a dark, powerful fashion – each painting standing as a call for human justice, and global peace.

A large part of his oeuvre comes from his Social Realism phase, culminating in the largest exhibition of the year at the Kunsthalle Bern in 1926, Aegerter exhibited with Käthe Kollwitz. R.R. Junghanns, and Dora Lauterburg amongst others. For ten years thereafter, Aegerter did not exhibit, being fully engaged in politics.

After the war, having completed his Borinage series to much acclaim, there was a growing demand for murals and frescos by Aegerter. During the ensuing decade he completed more than ten murals, none of which have survived except one. These gross format works drew on classical symbolism as well as the Neue Sachlichkeit, with strong clear lines, which his good friend and artistic colleague, Niklaus Stoecklin, had popularized in Switzerland (exhibition in the Kunsthalle Basel 1959, K.A., Niklaus Stoecklin). With the death of his wife Elisabeth Gerter, the human figure disappeared from his painting and his work became more and more focused on architectural subjects and landscapes. Not only did the human figure slowly leave his work, but human suffering as well. His late works offer up generous landscapes, alpine settings, peaceful natural scenes – new horizons and a new palette, working with bright felt pens, a modern development, to layout his later works. Aegerter's works are prized in numerous private and public collections around the world. His work has often been likened that of Edvard Munch.

== Exhibitions ==
Solo Exhibitions:

- 1926: Gemälde, Galerie Schäfle, Bern
- 1941: Galerie Knöll, Basel
- 1942: Atelier-Ausstellung, Basel
- 1944: Drawings and und Designs, Fälkli Basel
- 1950: K.A. zum 60. Geburtstag, Kunsthalle Basel
- 1953: Kunsthalle Basel
- 1953: Schloss Ebenrain, Sissach
- 1955: Kunstmuseum Lausanne
- 1959: Jubiläumsausstellung, Kunsthalle Basel
- 1960: Galerie Belvedere, Hergiswil
- 1970: Heimatmuseum, Rorschach: K.A. zum 80. Geburtstag, Landenberg-Gesellschaft, Arbon
- 1974: Galerie Orly, Basel
- 1977: Galerie Steiner, Thun
- 1980: Coop-Bildungszentrum, Muttenz, Weihnachtsausstellung
- 1982: Galerie Kyburg, Thun
- 1987: Musee Lapidaire, St. Ursanne
- 1996 Galerie Curtins, St.Moritz. Vorwort zum Katalog von (Altbundesrat) H.P. Tschudi
- 1997: Karl Aegerter 1888–1969, Gestalter des Humanen, Curtins, St. Moritz
- 2005: Galerie Folke Truedsson, Röschenz
- 2006: Galerie Mesmer, Basel

Group Exhibitions:

- 1917: Königliche Akademie München, Wettbewerb List of Works held by Collections "Arbeiter"
- 1924: Grafik (August und Karl Aegerter), Galerie Richter, Dresden
- 1925: Gemälde, (zus. mit August Aegerter, Hermann Geibel und 4 anderen Künstlern), Werdau
- 1925: Gemälde, Stadtmuseum Bautzen
- 1925: Gemälde, sächs. Kunstverein, Dresden
- 1926: Graph. Ausstellung: Käthe Kollwitz, K.A., Hans Brasch, Dora Lauterburg, R.R. Junghanns, Otto Séquin, Fritz Traffelet, Kunsthalle Bern
- 1926: Galerie Stegmeier, Biel
- 1927: Kunsthalle Bern, Weihnachtsausstellung
- 1941: Nationale Kunstausstellung, Luzern Jeweils Bilder an den Weihnachtsausstellungen des Basler Kunstvereins,1937–1945. Malerei, Grafik (Figürliches, Landschaft und Porträt)
- 1943: Gruppenausstellungen (GSMBA, Sektion Basel), Mustermesse, Kunsthaus Zürich
- 1944: "Jüngere Basler Künstler", Kunsthalle Fälkli, Basel
- 1945: Gruppenausstellung "Engadiner Landschaften", Galerie Wolfsberg, Zürich
- 1945: Gruppenausstellung (GSMBA), Bern
- 1945: Gruppenausstellung (GSMBA, Sektion Basel), Kunsthaus Zürich
- 1947: Regionale Ausstellung des Schweiz. Kunstvereins, Kunstmuseum St. Gallen, Chur und Solothurn
- 1948: Gruppenausstellung, 5 Basler Maler, Kunsthalle Bern
- 1950: Jubiläumsausstellung Karl Aegerter, Jacques Düblin, Emil Knöll, Karl Moor, Walter Schneider, Kunsthalle Basel
- 1950: Gruppenausstellung, (XXII. GSMBA)
- 1953: Museum Allerheiligen, Schaffhausen
- 1959: Karl Aegerter/Niklaus Stoecklin, Kunsthalle Basel
- 1959: Kunstmuseum Luzern, "Moderne Wandmalerei in der Schweiz
- 1961: Ausstellung Alpiner Kunst, Thun
- 1965: Brüssel, "Les arts en Europe"
- 1997: Galerie Laterne, Basel
- 1998: Galerie Laterne, Basel
- 2002: Karl Aegerter/Ruedi Pfirter, Galerie Laterne, Basel
- 2005: Galerie Laué, Avenches, Gruppenausstellung, "Maler des Menschlichen"
- 2007: Galerie Laterne, Basel
- 2008: Engadin aus malerischer Sicht, Galerie Curtins, St. Moritz (Gruppenausstellung zus. mit: Alioth, Max A.A., Giacometti, Alb., Giacometti, Silvio, Guidon, J., Heitz, Leni, Könz, Constant, und Emil Nolde, Peltenburg-Breschneff, Sigg, H.A., Vinzens, Ursina

== List of works held in collections ==
- "Lesender", "Winterlandschaft", "Passwang", "Arbeitergruppe" und Zeichnungen staatlicher Kunstkredit, Basel (für die öff. Slg., *Kupferstichkabinett), 1941–1944, 1947
- "Die Heimkehr", "Der Fabrikweg"—Schweiz. Eidgenossenschaft, (EDI)
- "Selbstbildnis" Öffentlich Kunstsammlung, Basel
- "Bergarbeiter-Dorf"—1950, Kunstverein Basel, Oil on canvas
- "Humanität"—1957, Mural in Basel, Jakobsberg
- "Arbeiter"—2008, Gift to the Solothurner Kunstmuseums

With the exception of “Humanität“, all of Aegerter's murals in Basel and the surroundings have been lost as a result of reconstruction

== Literature ==
- 1953 Allgemeines Lexikon der bildenden Künstler des XX. Jahrhunderts
- 1953 Schiess, W.S.: Karl Aegerter
- 1957 Ein Querschnitt durch das Schaffen des Basler Kunstmalers Karl Aegerter
- 1958 Künstlerlexikon der Schweiz. XX. Jahrhundert
- 1962 "Gestalter des Humanen", (Werkverzeichnis)
- 1992 Allgemeines Künstlerlexikon: Die bildenden Künstler alle Zeiten & Völker
- 1998 Biographisches Lexikon der Schweizer Kunst
- 2002 Historisches Lexikon der Schweiz (HLS)
