= Andrea Darvi =

American actress

Andrea Darvi (born Andrea Margolis, 1952) is a social worker and author and a former child actress mainly in American television in the 1960s.

Her TV roles were nearly all in mainstream productions. A popular choice in casting, she was a familiar face on American television. Her career peaked in 1964 when she was 12 years old.

== Acting career ==
The daughter of Samuel and Evelyn Margolis, she had her acting debut in the 1960 The Twilight Zone episode, "Night of the Meek". She appeared again in the episode "Dust" two weeks later. She then appeared in episodes of 87th Precinct, Peter Gunn and The Untouchables, returning to the latter in another episode in 1962, followed by episodes of Bonanza, Pete and Gladys, Hawaiian Eye and Adventures in Paradise.

In 1963 she appeared on The Danny Thomas Show and starred in an episode of Death Valley Days alongside Gilbert Roland. In 1964 she appeared as “Amity”, the title character in the S9E27 offering “Owney Tupper Had A Daughter” on Gunsmoke. She appeared as Nezhmet in a 1966 episode of I Spy. She appeared in four episodes of the TV series Combat!, including one 1966 episode named after her character "Gitty". She appeared as Greti Koska in Alfred Hitchcock's Torn Curtain in 1966, and she appeared in the Disney movie Monkeys Go Home of 1967. Once a teen, she essentially outgrew her career as a "child" actress but made one final appearance in 1971 in The Night God Screamed.

== Education ==
She holds three academic degrees: B.A. in English, University of California, Berkeley; MA in journalism, University of Southern California; and MSW (Master of Social Work), University of California, Los Angeles (UCLA).

== Family ==
In 1979 she married veteran journalist Tom Plate, who later became a professor at UCLA and at Loyola Marymount University). Tom Plate died in May 2023, after 43 years of marriage. They have one child and two grandchildren.

== Post-acting career/published works ==
Darvi, a licensed clinical social worker (LCSW) in California, worked for the Department of Veterans Affairs for nearly 15 years (2003–2017).

She is a published author: In 2019, she authored the internationally published Madness: In the Trenches of America's Troubled Department of Veterans Affairs (Marshall Cavendish Intl.)

She currently teaches in the Sociology Department of Loyola Marymount University and was for four years a board member of US Vets Initiative, America's largest nonprofit serving homeless veterans.
