= Tom Plate =

American journalist (1944–2023)

Thomas Gordon Plate (May 17, 1944 – May 23, 2023) was an American journalist, university professor and op-ed columnist. Since 1996 his continuing column on Asia – and later specifically on the U.S. China relationship – appeared in leading newspapers across the globe, including the South China Morning Post in Hong Kong, where he was a regular overseas opinion-section contributor from Los Angeles; and before that in The Straits Times in Singapore, The Khaleej Times out of Dubai, United Arab Emirates, The Japan Times in Tokyo, The Korea Times in South Korea, The Jakarta Post, the International Herald Tribune (pre-NY Times takeover), and many others. He was Editor of the Editorial Pages of the Los Angeles Times from 1989 to 1995, and a L.A. Times op-ed columnist until 1999. Before his death, he was at Loyola Marymount University in Los Angeles as its Distinguished Scholar of Asian and Pacific Studies and in the Asian and Asian American Studies Department, in the university's Bellarmine College of Arts and Sciences. He was founder and editor-in-chief of Asia Media International (asiamedia.lmu.edu), America's only website run by college students devoted entirely to Asia and the U.S. He was a Charter Member of LMU's Phi Beta Kappa chapter (Omega of California). From 2017 he served as a board member and Vice President of the Pacific Century Institute, a track-two 'building bridges' nonprofit based in Los Angeles, with branch offices in East Asia.

== Biography ==
=== Early life ===
Thomas Plate was born in New York City. At the age of five Plate's parents moved him and his sister Maureen, to Long Island. He attended public schools on Long Island before transferring to the Franciscan Preparatory Seminary in Pennsylvania at the age of fifteen. Before long, Plate left the seminary and entered Walt Whitman High School on Long Island and became an editor of the school newspaper, The Whitman Window. He graduated from high school and left Long Island in 1962.

After a year at the University of Pittsburgh under a General Motors Scholarship, he transferred to Amherst College. In 1966, he received a Bachelor's degree in political science from Amherst (Phi Beta Kappa, cum laude). While at Amherst College, Plate became Managing Editor of the Amherst Student, the campus newspaper, and was head of the student speakers' program as well as the editor of PAIDEIA, then the student literary magazine. In 1965 (March 3) his editorial arguing against U.S. involvement in the Vietnam war appeared in the Amherst student newspaper, where he was managing editor. It was considered one of the first, if not the first, U.S. student newspaper anti-war editorial. He continued his studies at Princeton University's School of Public and International Affairs. There, Plate served on the editorial board of the policy review and earned his master's degree in public affairs from Princeton in 1969, with an emphasis on the U.S. role in the world.

=== Career ===
During his years at Amherst and Princeton, Plate worked as a campus correspondent for Newsweek and the Washington Post. He also interned at both media institutions, as well as at the United States State Department in Washington in the summer of 1967 as a speechwriter, between Amherst graduation and Princeton enrollment.

In 1970 he wrote his first book Understanding Doomsday: A Guide to the Nuclear Arms Race for Hawks, Doves and People. His career in journalism includes long stints at: Newsday (Long Island, under David Laventhol), New York Magazine (under Clay Felker), the Los Angeles Herald Examiner (under James Bellows), where he won a coveted Deadline Writing Award from the American Society of Newspaper Editors and for three-years-running the Beat Editorial Award from The Greater Los Angeles Press Club, The Daily Mail of London (under Sir David English); New York Newsday (under Don Forst); and Time magazine (under Ray Cave). In 1989, Plate moved from New York City to Los Angeles (under Editor Shelby Coffey and Publisher and CEO David Laventhol. In Los Angeles, from the end of 1989 to the fall of 1995, Plate was Editor of the Editorial Pages of the Los Angeles Times. In this position he supervised the daily editorial and Sunday op-ed pages. While there, these sections garnered significant professional recognition, including awards from the California Newspaper Publishers Association and national newspaper design awards. In 1992, when he was editor of its editorial (opinion) pages, the Los Angeles Times won the Pulitzer Prize for its treatment of the Los Angeles Riots. In 1999, he was selected as a Hoover Institution Media Fellow. In 2011, his 'Conversations With Lee Kuan Yew,' the first in the 'Giants of Asia' book series, in the annual open-voting competition organized by Popular Books in Southeast Asia, was awarded the People's Choice Award for English nonfiction.

As a journalist, Tom Plate has interviewed leading political figures and world leaders, including U.S. Presidents Ronald Reagan and Bill Clinton, British Prime Ministers John Major and Tony Blair, Japanese Prime Ministers Keizo Obuchi and Junichiro Koizumi, South Korean Presidents Kim Young Sam and Kim Dae Jung, Singaporean Minister Mentor Lee Kuan Yew, Malaysian Prime Minister Mahathir Mohamad, Thailand Prime Minister Thaksin Shinawatra and UN Secretary General Ban Ki-moon. While column-writing for the Los Angeles Times in July 1997, he was the first American commentator to warn that the implosion of Thailand's Baht currency could the trigger a larger crisis in East Asia – to wit, the Asian Financial Crisis. His columns add up the longest-running newspaper-appearing column about Asia by a living American journalist. In the foreword to Plate's 2014 book 'In the Middle of China's Future: Tom Plate on Asia', Ambassador Kishore Mahbubani, founding dean of the Lee Kuan Yew School of Public Policy and Singapore's noted former ambassador to the United Nations, wrote this: "Tom Plate is one of the few Western journalists who have gotten the world's biggest story [the rise of China] right."

As an educator, Plate has presented guest lectures or courses at a wide range of institutions, including Stanford University, the U.S. Pacific Command in Honolulu, Santa Monica College, Kyoto University in Japan and the United Arab Emirates University in Al Ain, UAE, where he was a Visiting Professor and prepared a joint live Internet interactive course between UAEU and LMU on the media and politics of Asia. Since then he has conduced joint live Internet interactive courses from LMU with major Asian universities such as Fudan in Shanghai (2015) and Yonsei in Seoul (2016, 2017, 2018, 2019, 2020). Over the years he has been invited to international conferences, including for four years the World Economic Forum in Davos. In Los Angeles, at Loyola Marymount University, Plate, as its Distinguished Scholar in Asian and Pacific Studies, teaches a number of courses, including "An Introduction to the Media and Politics of Asia." an introductory course on the U.S.-China relationship and "The Future of the United Nations," the latter based in part on his 2010–2012 one-on-one conversations with UN Secretary General Ban Ki-moon, for his 4th Giant of Asia, "Conversations with Ban Ki-Moon" book. In addition, his 'Tom Plate on Asia' book series includes "In the Middle of the Future' (2012), "In the Middle of China's Future" (2013),'The Fine Art of the Political Interview' (2015), and "Yo-Yo Diplomacy" (2017), all published by Marshall Cavendish International.

=== Personal life ===
He married the social worker and former child actress Andrea Darvi (Margolis) in 1979, with whom he had one child, Ashley Alexandra Plate, now the wife of Sam Keys and the mother of Maximus Pierce Keys and Milana (Mila) Juliet Keys. Plate was a member of the Del Rey Yacht Club, the UCLA Faculty Center, the Princeton Club of New York, the Hong Kong Correspondents Club (overseas member), and Century Association of New York.

== Death ==
On Tuesday, May 23, 2023, Plate died at the age of 79 due to natural causes. He was surrounded by family at the time of his passing.

== Bibliography ==
- Where The Boys Are (with Aaron Latham). Amherst, 1966.
- Understanding Doomsday (nonfiction), Simon & Schuster (New York), 1971.
- (With others) The Mafia at War, New York Magazine Press, 1972.
- Crime Pays! An Inside Look at Burglars, Car Thieves, Loan Sharks, Hit Men, Fences, and Other Professionals in Crime (nonfiction), Simon & Schuster, 1975.
- (With Patrick V. Murphy) Commissioner: A View from the Top of American Law Enforcement (nonfiction), Simon & Schuster, 1977.
- (With Andrea Darvi) Secret Police: The Inside Story of a Network of Terror, Doubleday (New York), 1981.
- The Only Way to Go (fiction), Dell (New York), 1981.
- Confessions of an American Media Man: What They Don't Tell You at Journalism School, Marshall Cavendish (Singapore), 2007.
- Conversations With Lee Kuan Yew: Citizen Singapore – How to Build a Nation, Marshall Cavendish (Singapore), 2010. Reprinted in 2010, 2011 AND 2013.
- Conversations with Mahathir Mohamad: Doctor M-Operation Malaysia, Marshall Cavendish (Singapore), 2011.
- Conversations with Thaksin: From Exile to Deliverance- Thailand's Populist Tycoon Tells His Story, Marshall Cavendish (Singapore), 2011.
- Conversations with Ban Ki-Moon: What the United Nations Is Really Like – A View from the Top, Marshall Cavendish (Singapore), 2012.
- In the Middle of the Future: Tom Plate on Asia, Marshall Cavendish (Singapore), 2014.
- "In the Middle of China's Future: Tom Plate on Asia – What Two Decades of Worldwide Newspaper Columns Prefigure about the Future of the China-U.S. Relationship", Marshall Cavendish (Singapore) 2014.
- "The Fine Art of the Political Interview", Marshall Cavendish (Singapore), 2015.
- "Yo-Yo Diplomacy" (2017

== Academia ==
For a span of more than 15 years, ending in August 2008 when he retired from UCLA, Professor Plate taught undergraduate courses in media, ethics and Asian politics and media. He was nominated by his department for a UCLA teaching award, and pioneered courses in the media and politics of Asia. While at UCLA, he founded the campus-based non-profit Asia Pacific Media Center. APMN served as a network for educators, journalists, media professionals, government and business officials concerned with regionally common issues, controversies and opportunities between America and the Pacific Rim. It spawned the online magazines Asia Media (asiamedia.lmu.edu )and Asia Pacific Arts, the latter now located at the University of Southern California. Professor Plate, a senior fellow at the Center for the Digital Future, now teaches at Loyola Marymount University in Los Angeles, where – wholly unretired – he is the Distinguished Scholar of Asian and Pacific Studies and founder and president of Asia Media International, the successor to Asia Media at UCLA. Prof. Plate is attached to the department of Asian and Asian-American Studies at LMU, where he has taught undergraduates since 2011.
