= Sebastian Plate =

German footballer (born 1979)

Personal information
- Date of birth: 7 August 1979 (age 47)
- Height: 1.81 m (5 ft 11 in)
- Position: Defender

Senior career*
| Years | Team | Apps | (Gls) |
| –2002 | Cronenberger SC | | |
| 2003–2005 | Borussia Mönchengladbach II | | |
| 2003–2005 | Borussia Mönchengladbach | 2 | (0) |
| 2005–2006 | SC Preußen Münster | 20 | (0) |
| 2007–2008 | SpVgg Radevormwald | | |
| 2008–2009 | Cronenberger SC | | |
| 2009–2012 | FC Remscheid | | |
- * Club domestic league appearances and goals as of 18:56, 6 February 2009 (UTC)

Sebastian Plate (born 7 August 1979) is a German football player. He spent two seasons in the Bundesliga with Borussia Mönchengladbach.
