= Friedrich Fehr =

German painter (1862–1927)

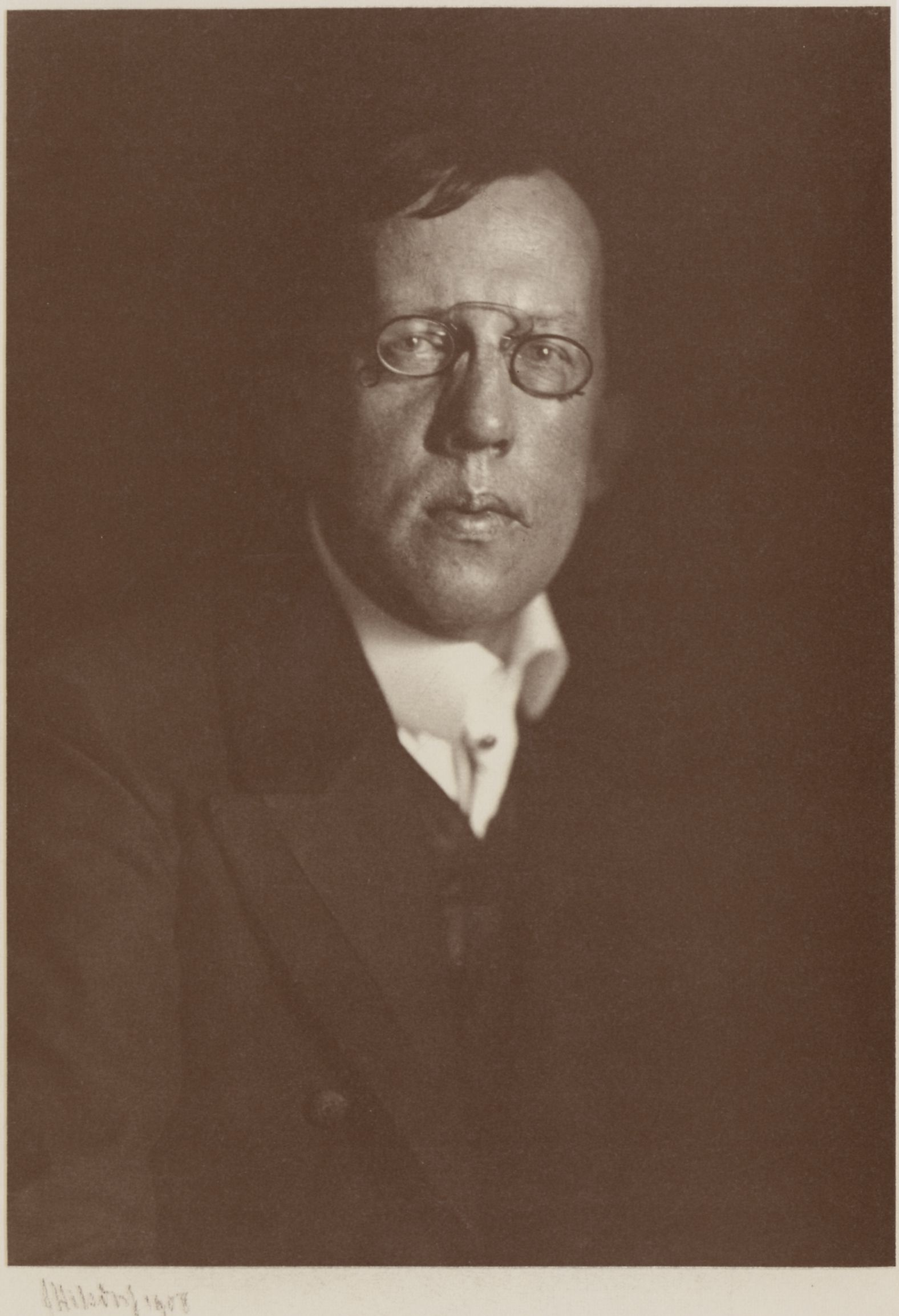
Friedrich Fehr (date unknown)

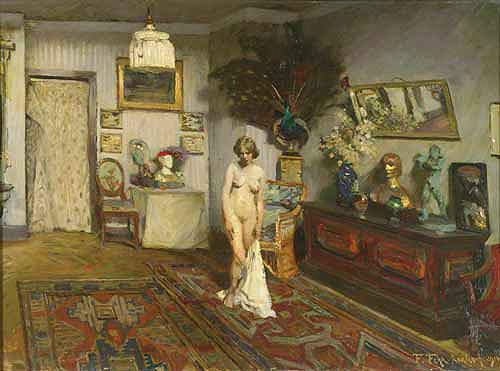
Interior Portrait with Nude Model

Friedrich Eduard Fehr (24 May 1862 – 29 September 1927) was a German painter in the Historicist atyle.

== Biography ==
He was born in Werneck to Kaspar Fehr, a notary, and his wife Anna. He initially attended the Realgymnasium in Würzburg then, from 1878 to 1884, he studied at the Academy of Fine Arts, Munich with Alexander Strähuber, Gyula Benczúr and Ludwig von Löfftz. A scholarship from the Martin von Wagner Foundation enabled him to make an extended study trip to Italy from 1885 to 1890.

Upon his return to Munich, he joined with Ludwig Schmid-Reutte and Paul Nauen to establish a private art school, whose students would come to include Emil Nolde, Clara Rilke-Westhoff, Hans Meyer-Kassel and Erich Kuithan, among many others. In 1896, when the Karlsruhe Artists' Association was founded, he became a corresponding member; promoting lithography and etching as necessary adjuncts to an artistic education.

In 1897, he married Berta Roloff (1868–1957). Later that year, he was offered a position at the Karlsruher Akademie. In 1899, after some consideration, he accepted their offer and became head of the painting class, which he oversaw until it was discontinued in 1923. His students included Wilhelm Hempfing, Margarethe von Reinken and Alexander Kanoldt. From 1904 to 1919, he also taught classes at the Malerinnenschule Karlsruhe (Women's' Art School). During this period, he expanded his own work to encompass interiors and genre scenes, in a style similar to the Dutch Masters. In 1915, he took a short leave from his teaching, to paint soldiers on the front lines.

After retiring in 1924, he and his family moved to Polling, where he died three years later. He was memorialized by the architect, Hermann Billing, and the sculptor, Hermann Binz, at the Stephanplatz Fountain in Karlsruhe, where one of the figures bears his likeness.

== Sources ==
- Biography @ the Stadtlexikon Karlsruhe
- 03554 Friedrich Fehr, Matrikelbuch 1841-1884 der Akademie der Bildenden Künste
