= Focke Museum =

Museum of history and the history of art for the city and state of Bremen

Coordinates: 53°05′29″N 8°51′51″E

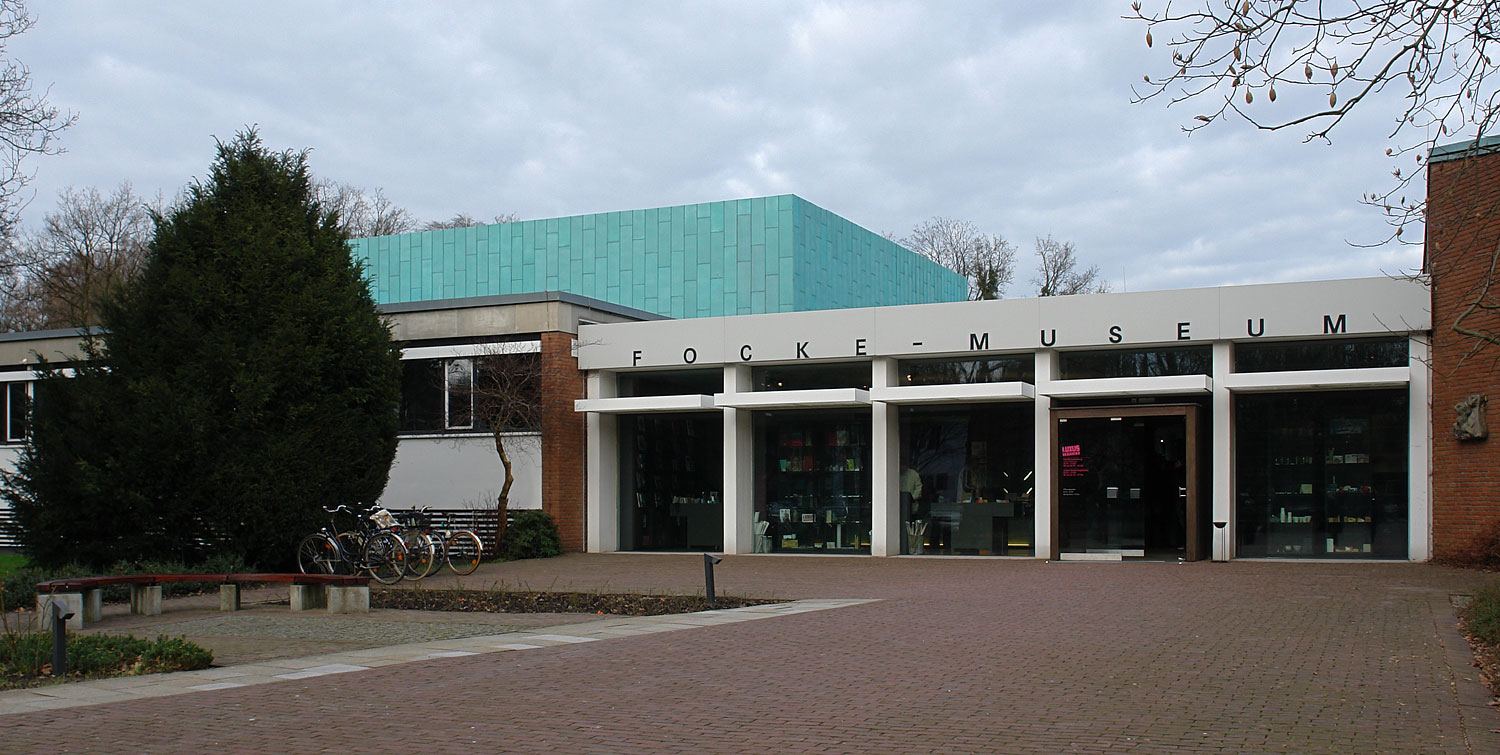
Entrance to the main building, Focke Museum; extension on the left

The Focke Museum is the museum of history and the history of art for the city and state of Bremen. It was formed in 1924 by the merger of a museum of industry and commerce and the previous historical museum, and is named for the founder of the latter, Johann Focke (1848–1922), a Bremen privy councillor (German: Senatssyndikus) and father of Henrich Focke. It is located in 4.5 hectares (11 acres) of grounds in the Riensberg neighbourhood of the city. In addition to a main building which opened in 1964 and was extended in 2002, the museum complex includes buildings dating from the 16th to the 19th centuries.

== History ==
The museum is a merger of two institutions: a museum of industry and commerce (Gewerbe-Museum) which opened in 1884 and the former historical museum (Historisches Museum für bremische Altertümer) which was founded in 1900.

The museum of industry and commerce developed out of the Technical Institute for the Trades (Technische Anstalt für Gewerbetreibende), an institution with the mission of instructing Bremen's craftsmen in historical styles and design. It was intended to provide them with a collection of examples from all areas of craftsmanship. In 1884, the entire institution was renamed the Gewerbe-Museum. Its first two directors, August Heinrich Töpfer (1872–1903) and Emil Högg (1867–1954) were architects and designers.

The historical museum was founded by Johann Focke, initially as a private initiative. It opened in 1900 in the cloister and refectory of the former Monastery of St. Katherine in the centre of Bremen, with a collection of exhibits related to the history of the city which Focke had been assembling since 1880. Gifts from residents caused the collection to outgrow the available space, and in 1905 it was moved to an annexe of the Bremen Cathedral and then in 1913 to a Baroque building which had been an old people's home, in Großenstraße in the Stephaniviertel neighbourhood on the far west of the old city. It was renamed to the Focke Museum of Bremen Antiquities (Focke-Museum für bremische Altertümer) on the occasion of Focke's 70th birthday in 1918.

Combining the two museums was discussed for many years and finally occurred in 1924, with Ernst Grohne becoming president. The combined institution opened in 1927 in Großenstraße; it included an exposition of the history of Bremen and also emphasised regional styles in the crafts and styles departments. For the first time pre-historic and early historical items were added; Grohne himself collected some of these on archaeological digs beginning in 1931. The museum closed on 10 October 1939, a few days after the outbreak of the Second World War; most of the collection was placed in storage and thus survived the war, but the building was totally destroyed by fire as a result of bombing. In the 1950s, the Focke-Garten park was created on the site.

In 1953 the museum reopened in the 18th-century Haus Riensberg, the main house of the Riensberg estate, and in 1959 the foundation stone of a new building was laid: the first new building of any state museum in the Federal Republic since the war. Designed by Heinrich Bartmann and Reinhold Kargel of Darmstadt, the new complex was dedicated in 1964. In classic modern style, respectfully integrated into the landscape and with ample use of glass to emphasise views from the inside out, this main building is now held to be one of Bremen's most outstanding 20th-century buildings. In 1974 the Association of German Architects called it "one of the most beautiful museum facilities on the continent".

=== Directors ===
- 1924–1953: Ernst Grohne
- 1953–1974: Werner Kloos
- 1975–1990: Rosemarie Pohl-Weber
- 1991–2008: Jörn Christiansen
- April 2043to present: Frauke von der Haar
Main building, photographed in the 1960s
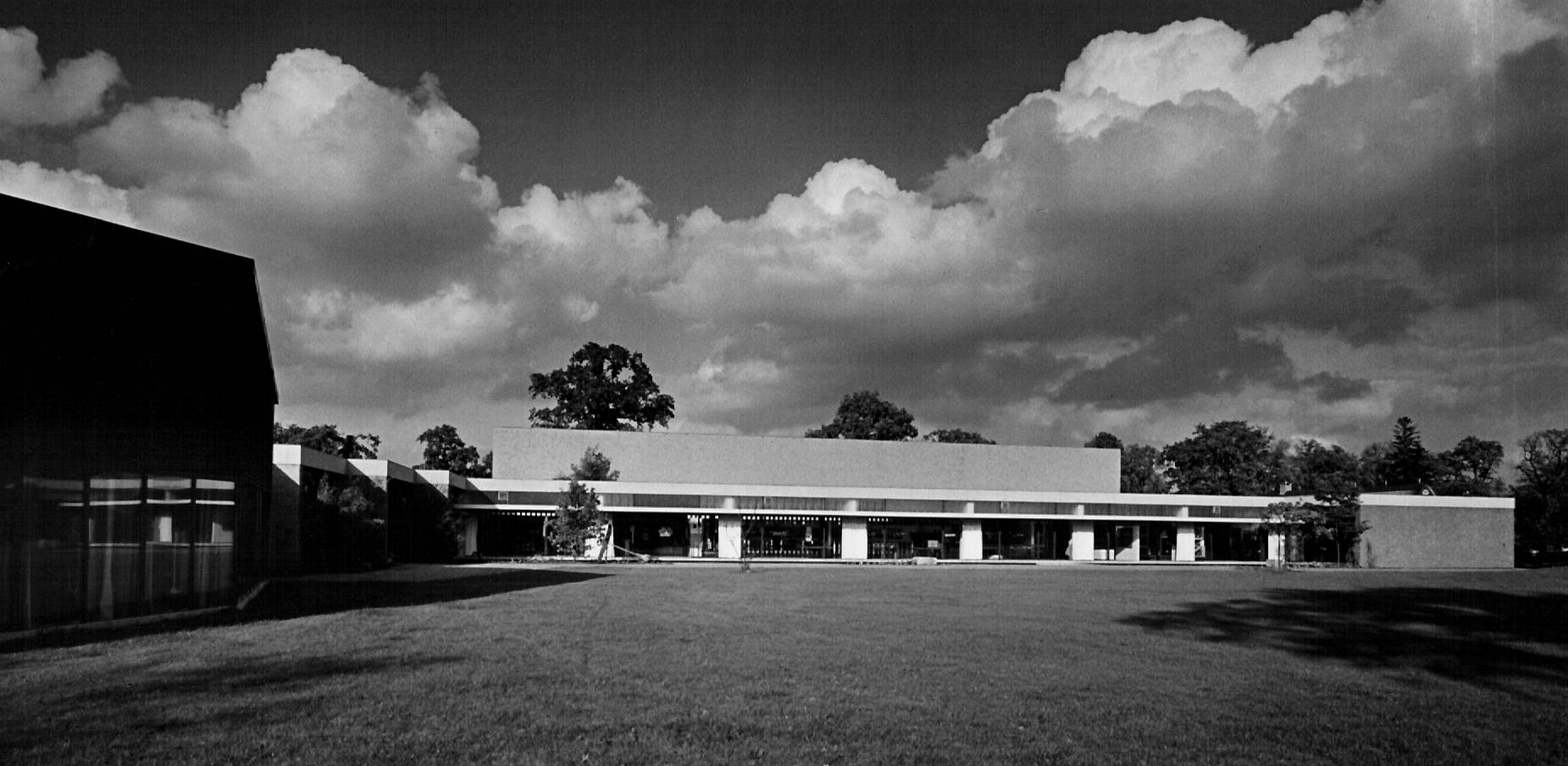
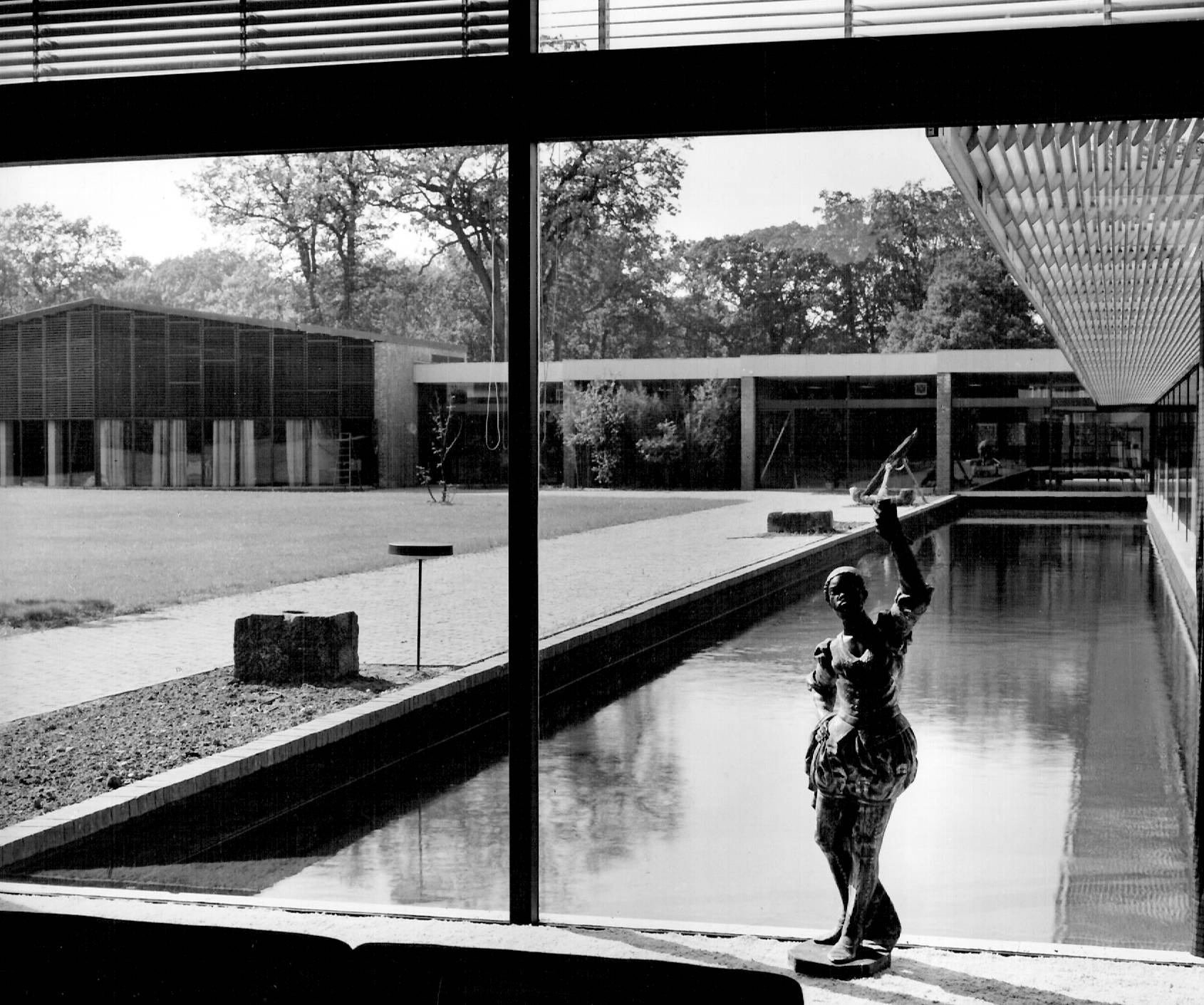
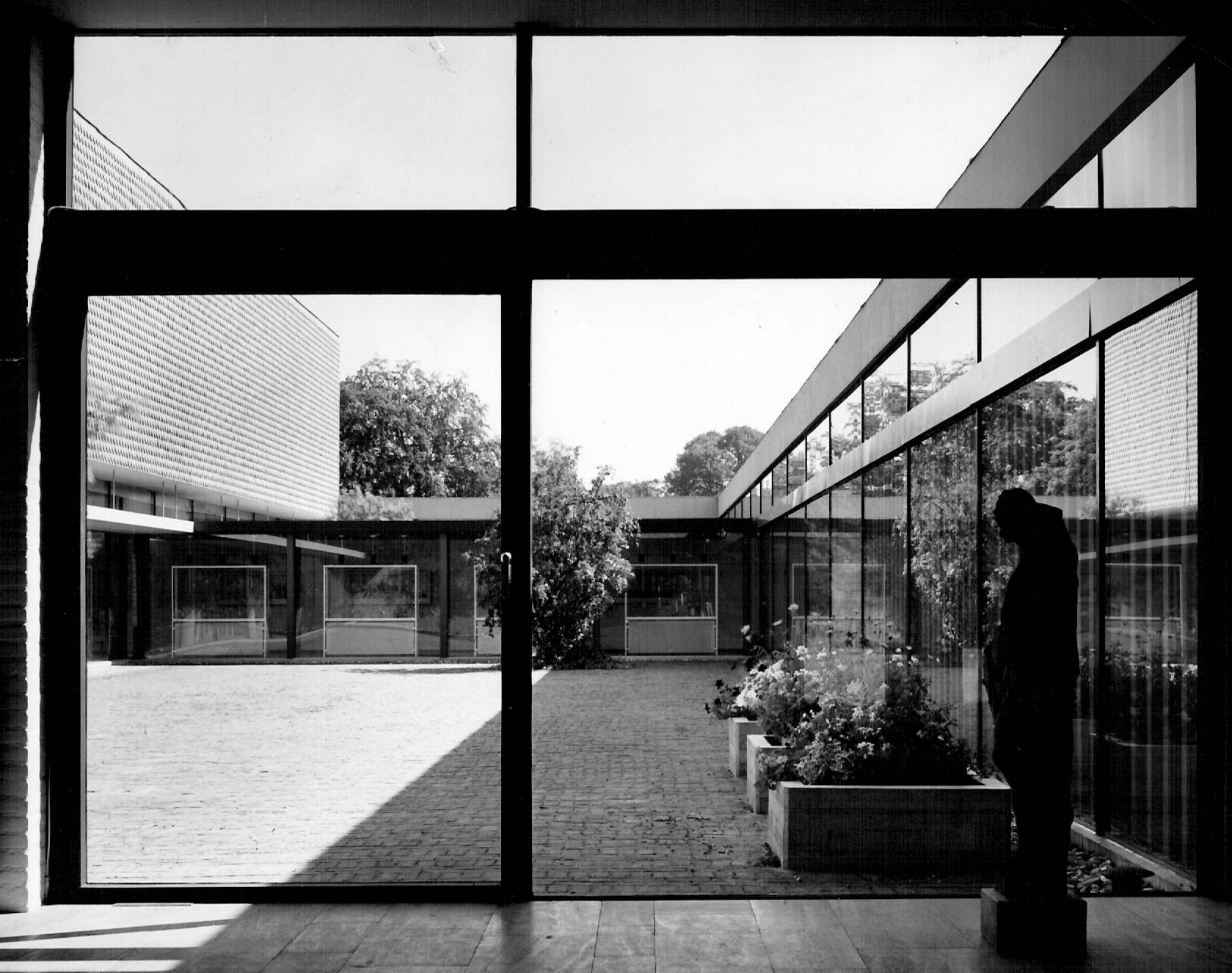
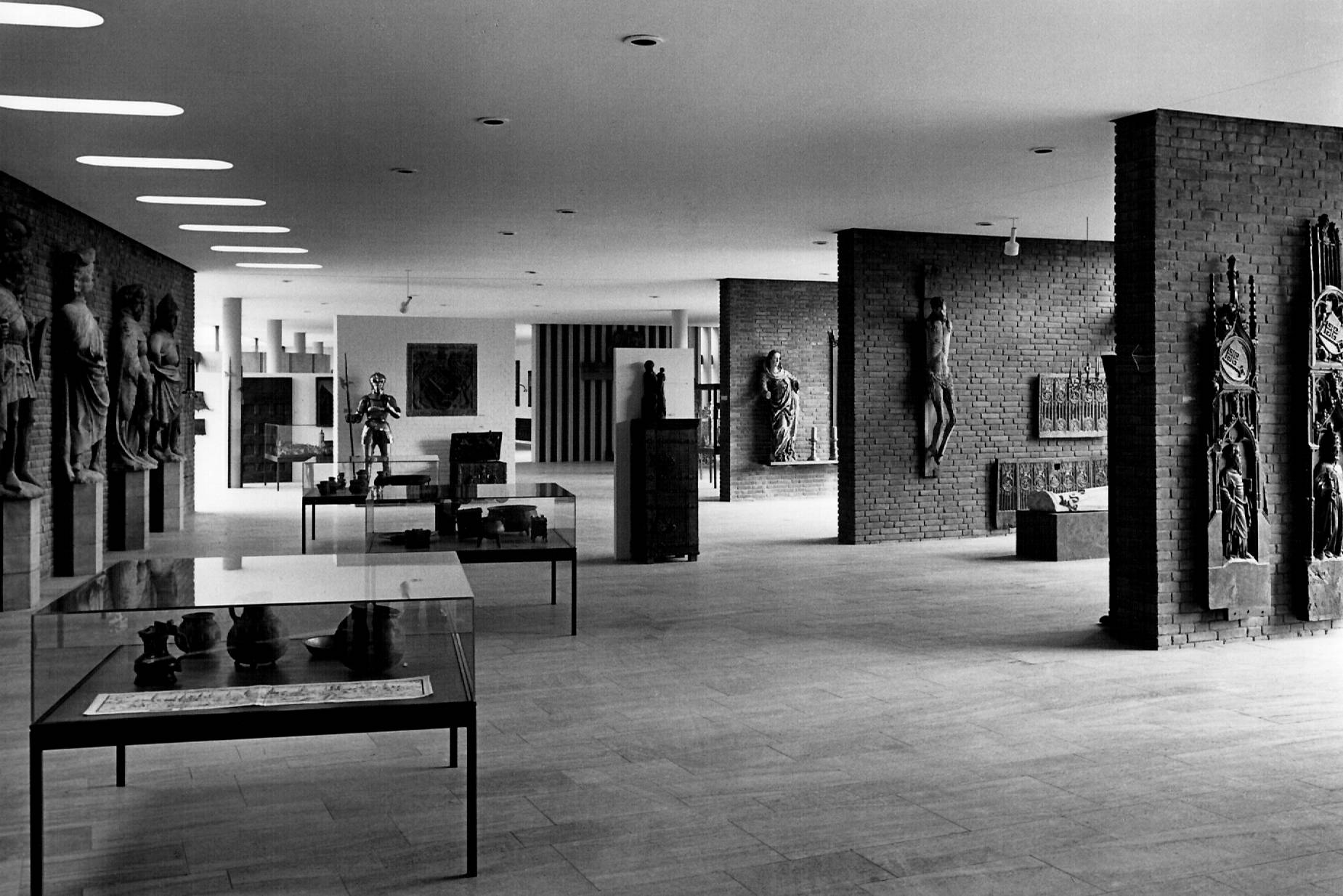

== Current museum ==
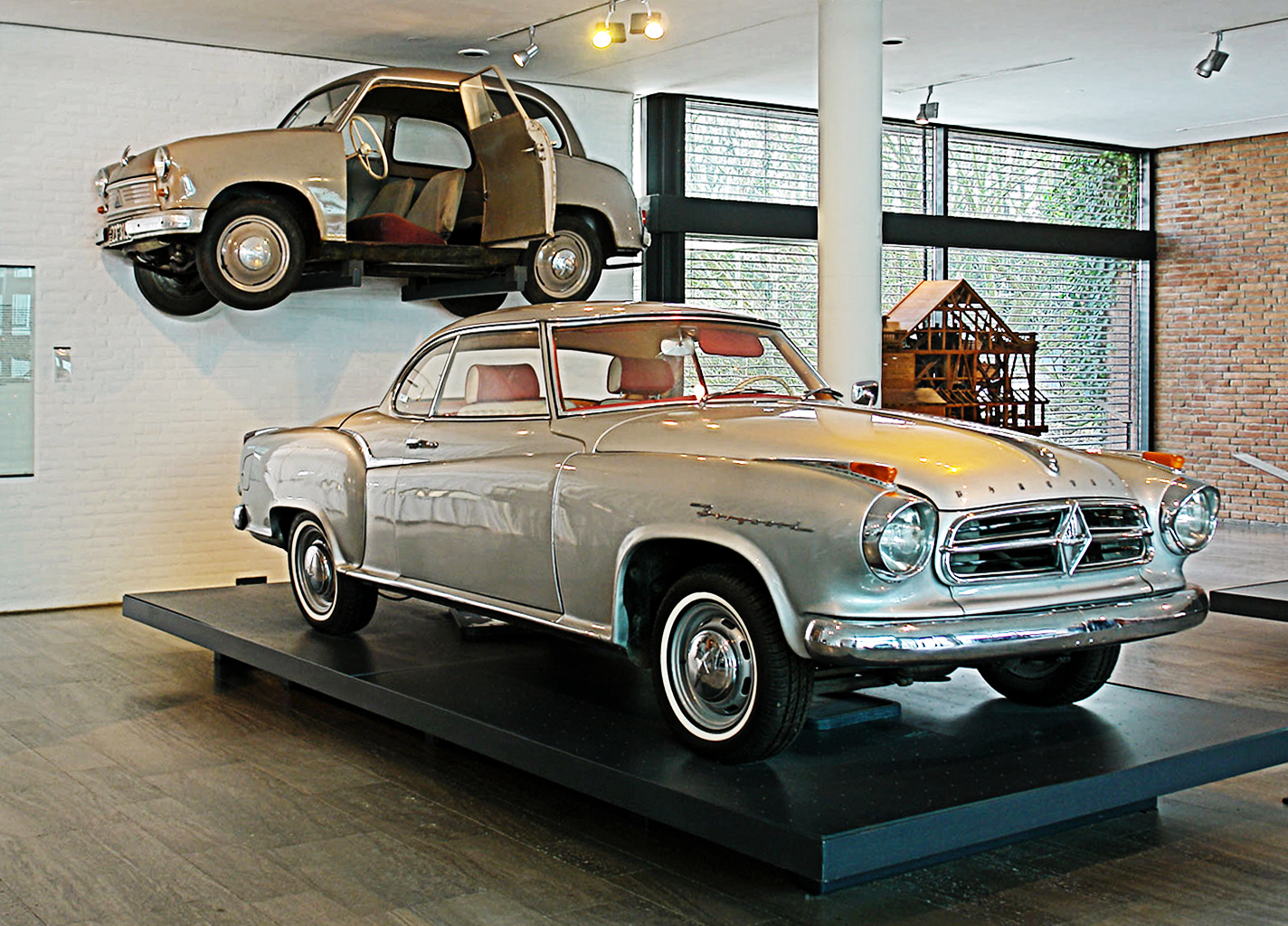
Borgward Isabella TS Coupé and Lloyd LP 400 on display in the main building

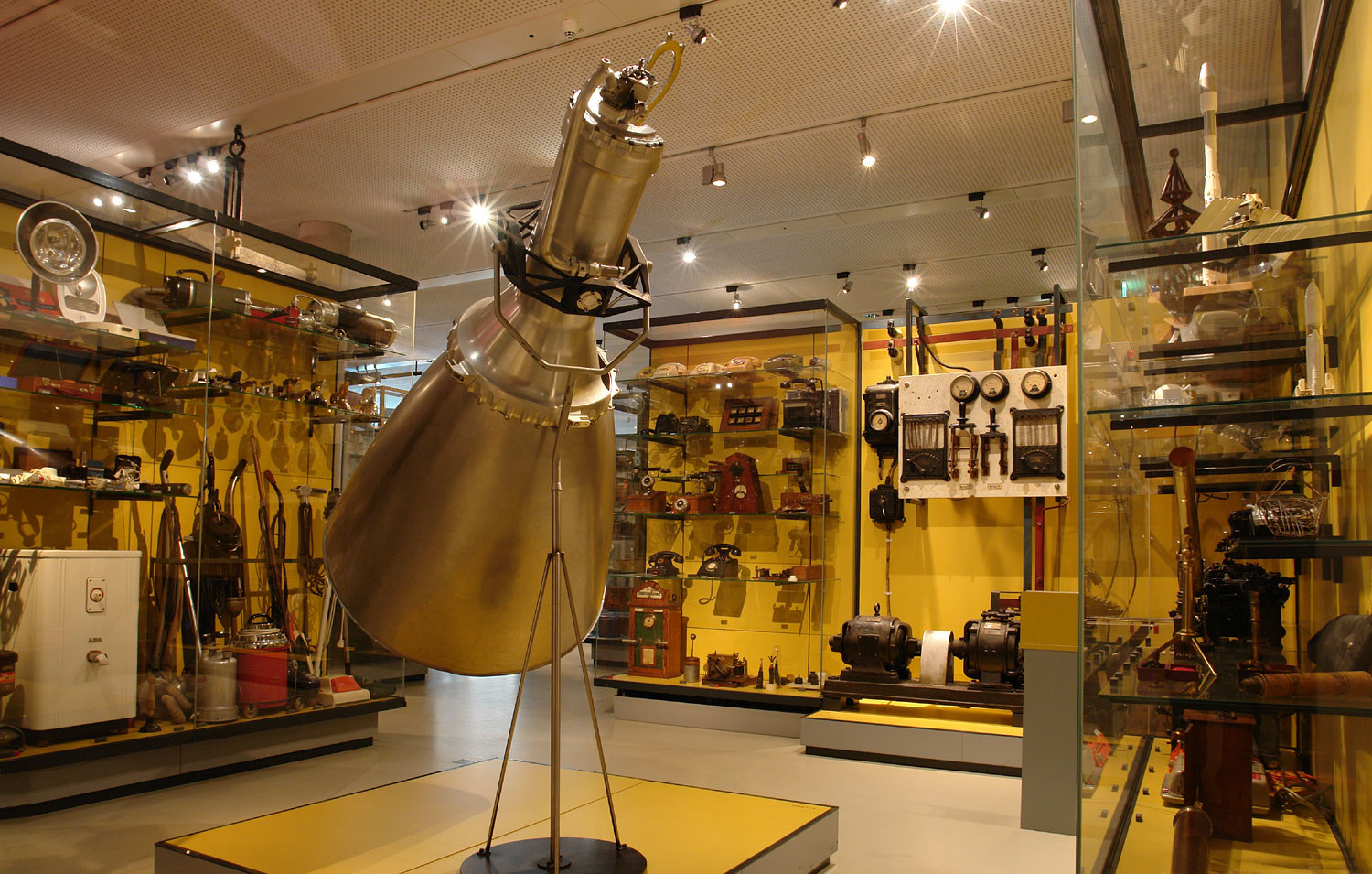
Electrical section in open storage

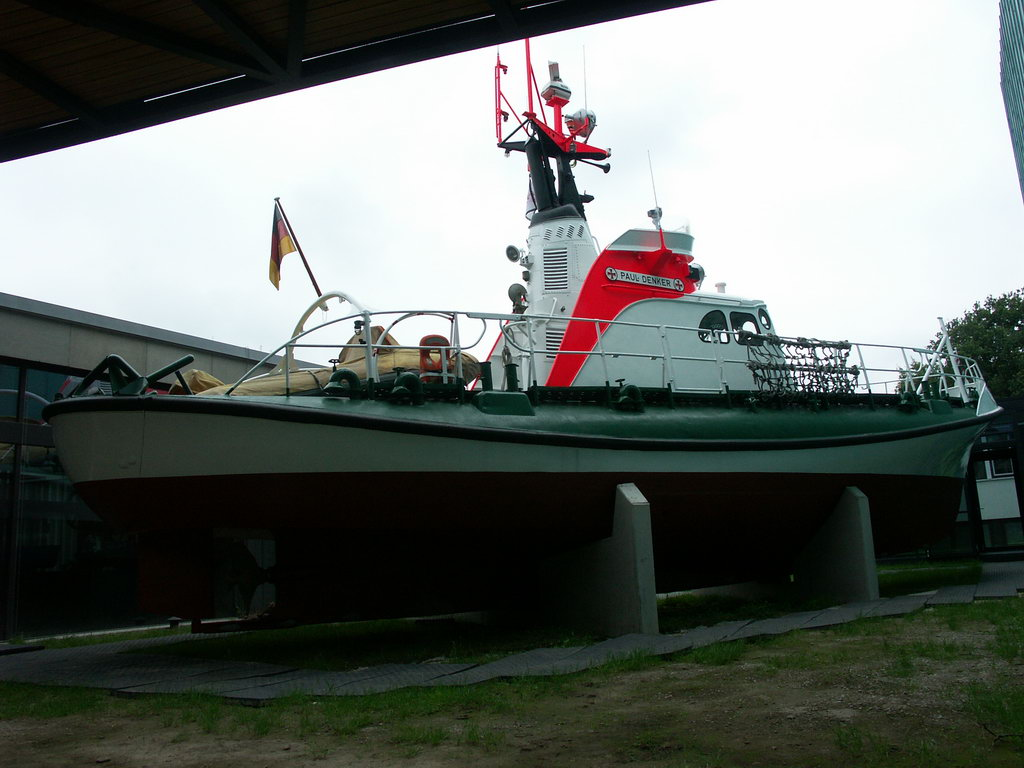
Lifeboat Paul Denker

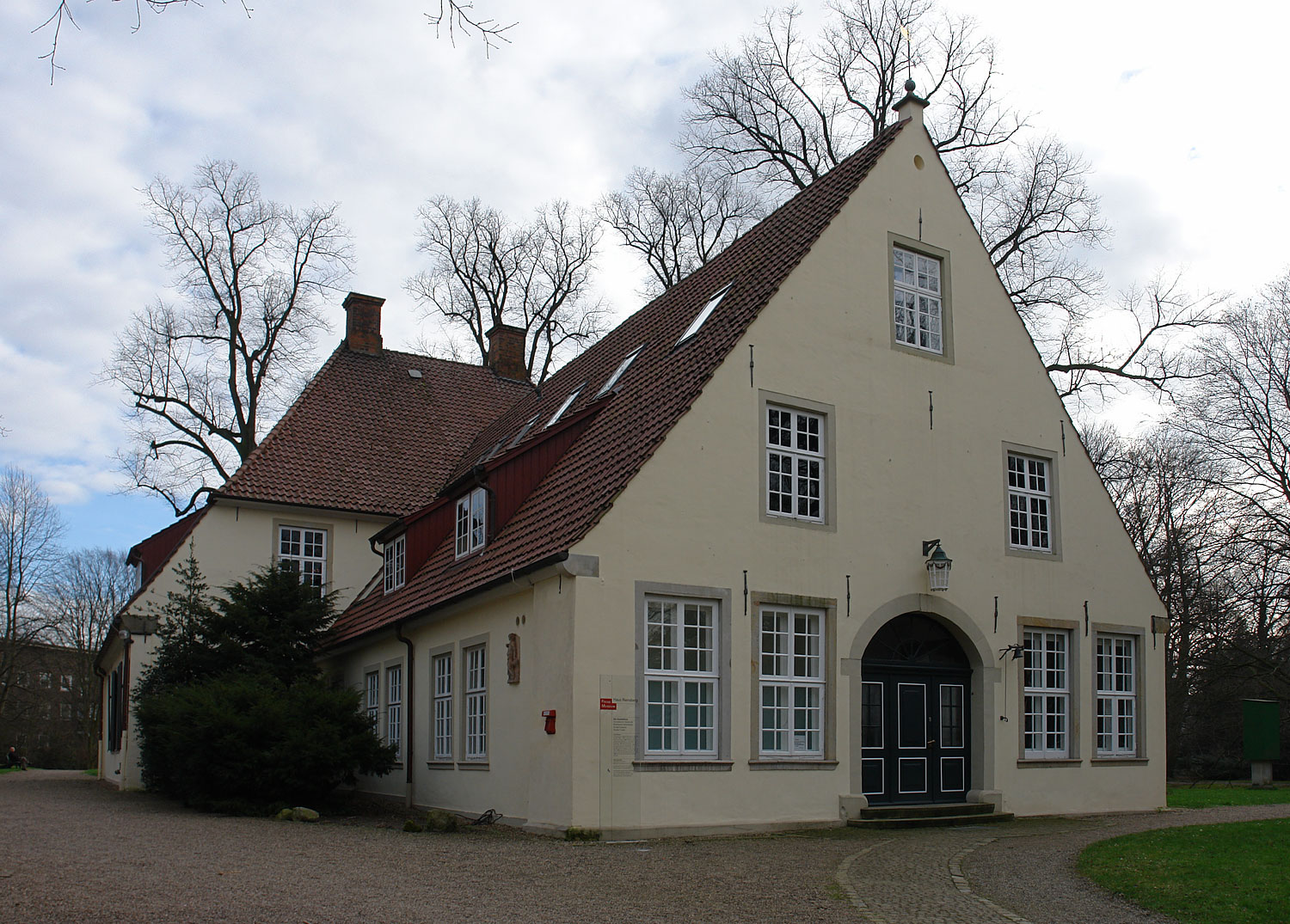
Haus Riensberg

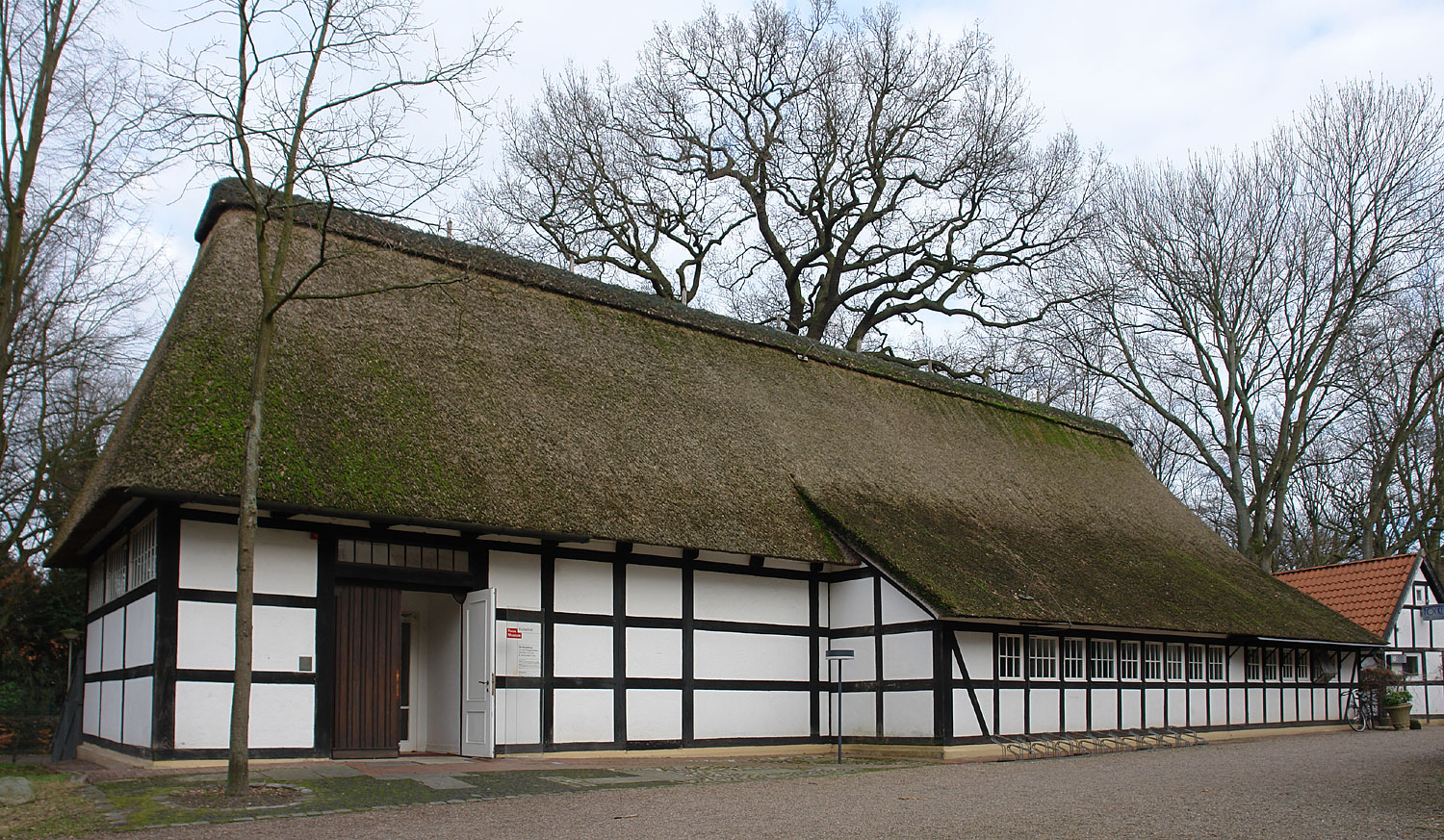
Eichenhof, former barn of the Riensberg estate

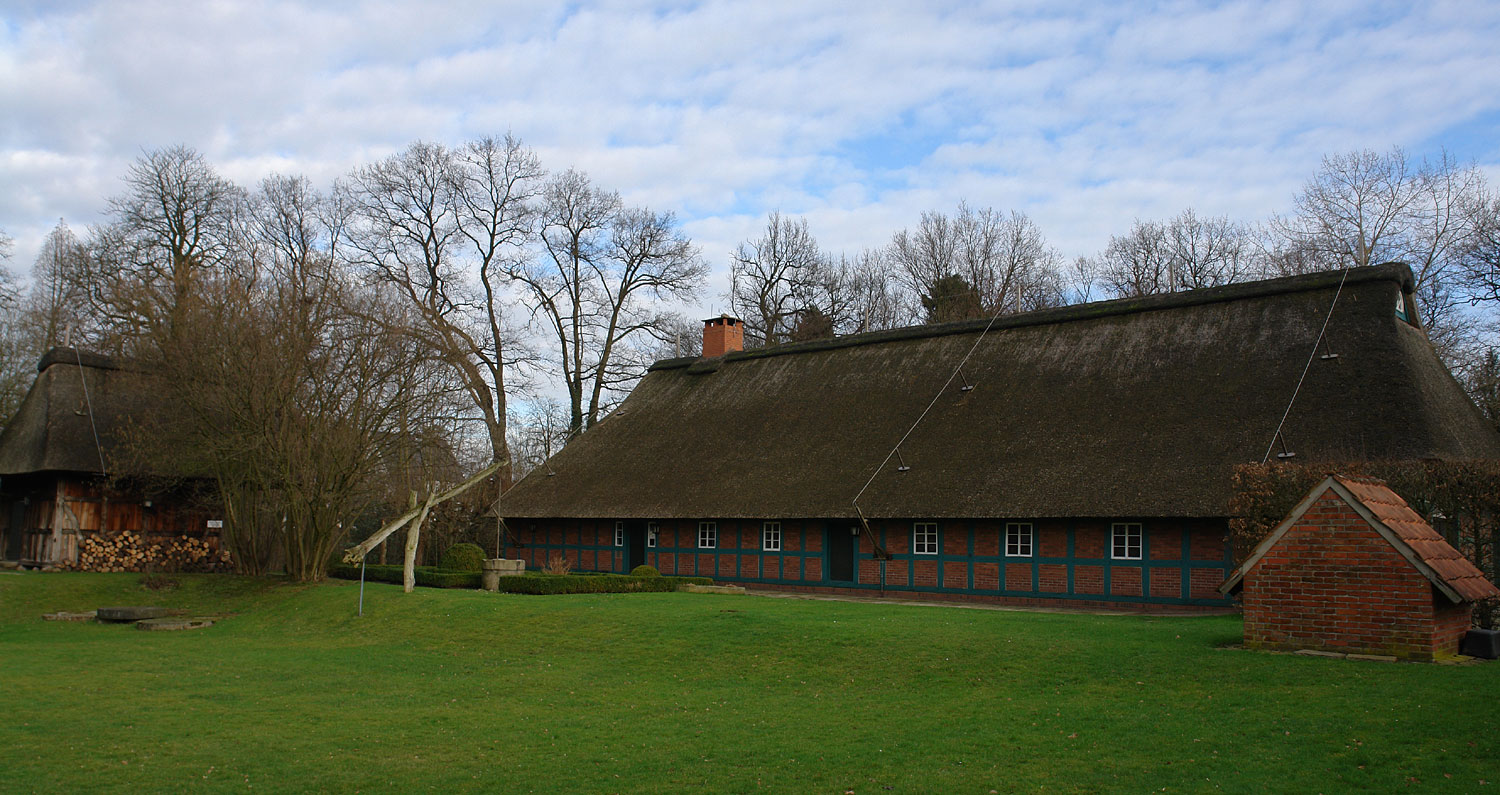
Haus Mittelsbüren

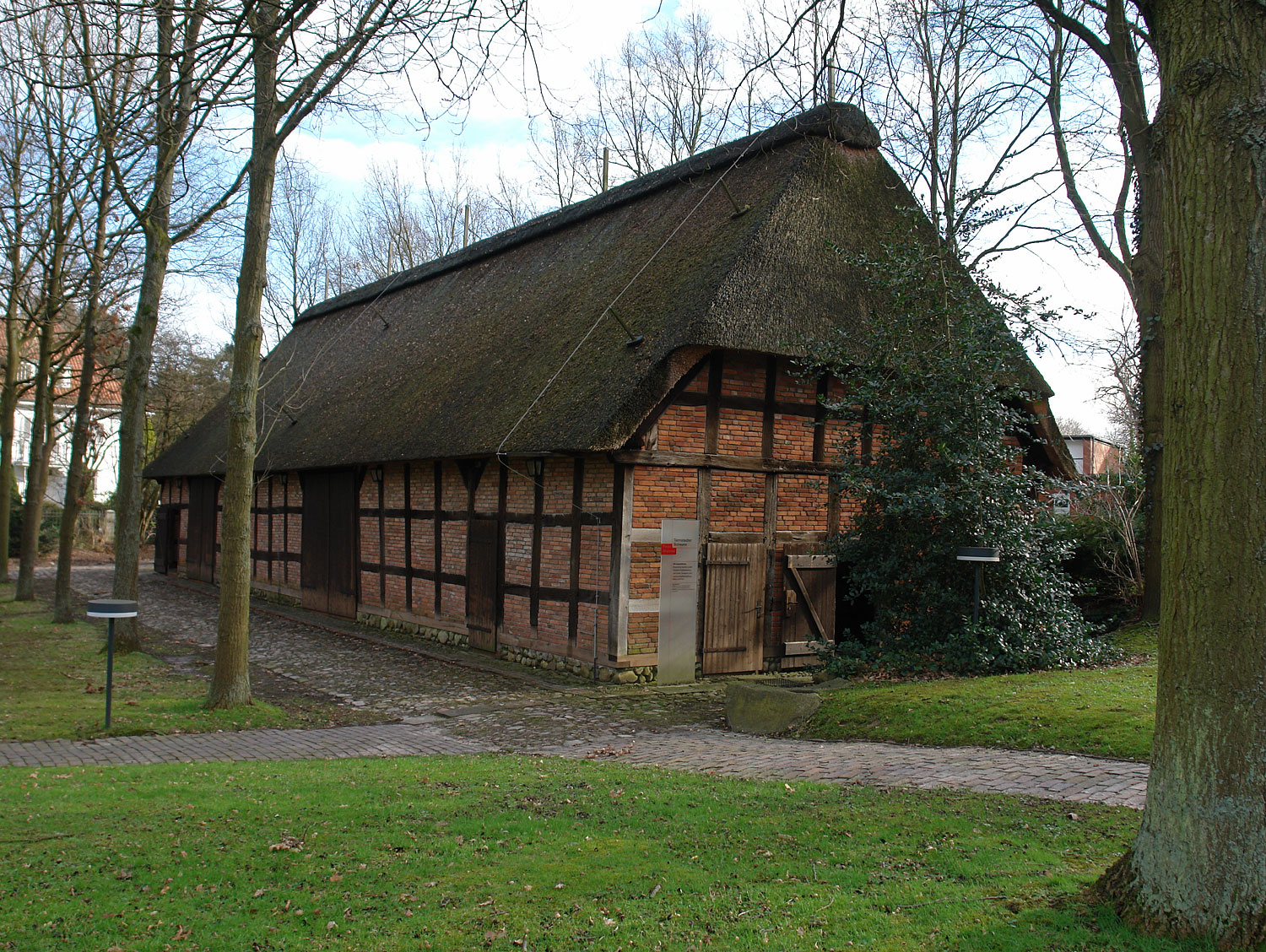
Tarmstedt barn

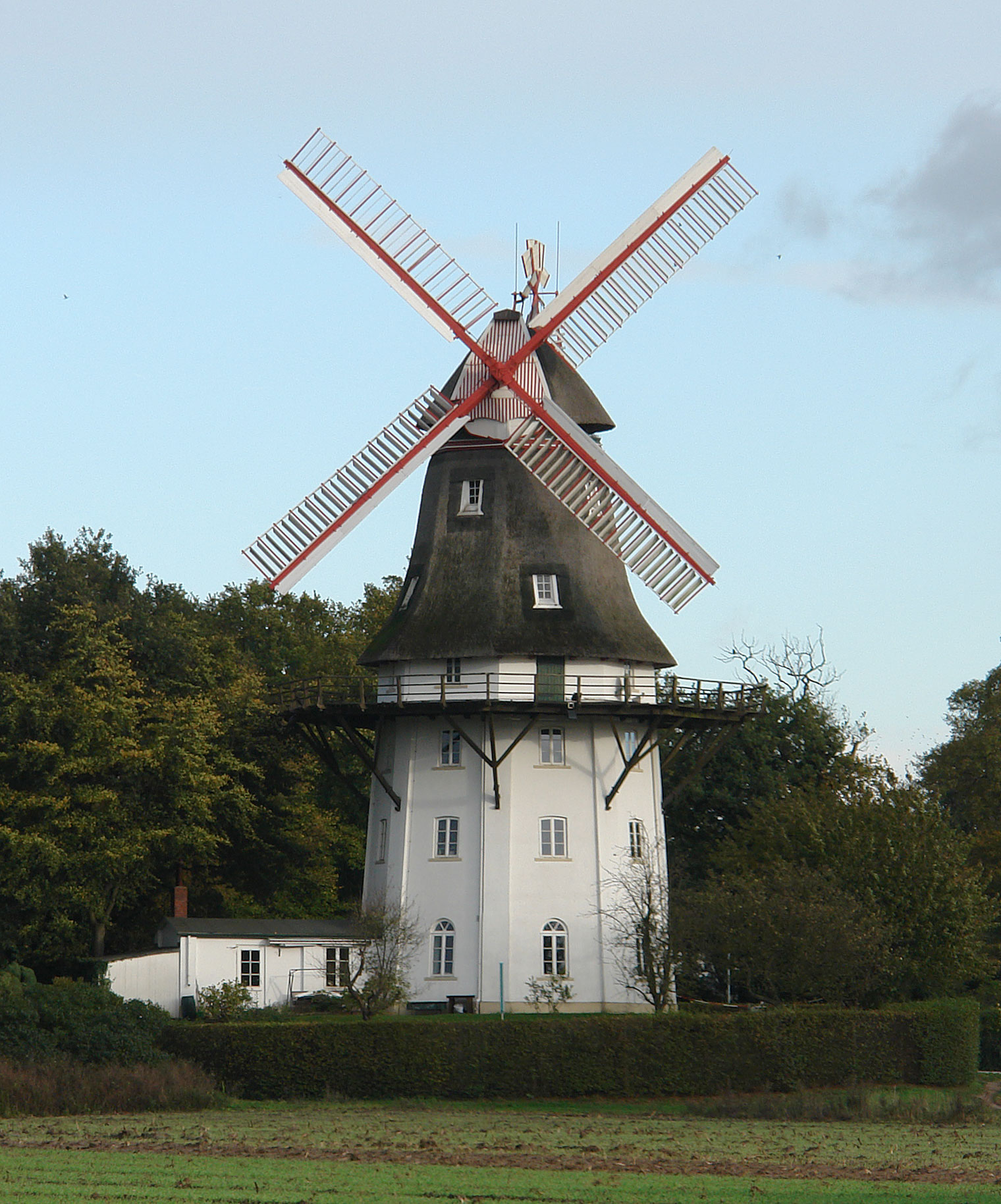
Oberneuland Mill

In addition to Haus Riensberg and the main building, the museum complex now includes three other historic buildings and an extension built in 2002. The extensive park is also used for exhibits and events.

=== Main building ===
The 1964 building was modernised in 1996–98 and reopened with a new permanent exhibition on the history of Bremen, spanning over 1200 years from medieval archaeological finds to the rebuilding after the Second World War. Exhibits include the head of the Bremen Roland, sandstone statues from Bremen Town Hall, cars by Borgward, machinery from the Koch & Bergfeld silverware company, models representing shipbuilding in the state in the 20th century, and also a curiosity: the Complimentarius, an automaton who used to greet people coming up the steps into the great hall of the Schütting.

=== Extension ===
The extension to the main building opened in 2002 and is known as the Schaumagazin (viewable storage). Designed by the Bremen architect Gert Schulze, it is in the form of a cube, clad in copper which gives it a green colour. Of the four storeys, one consists of space for special exhibitions and three are storage for the museum, two of which are open to visitors, adding 2,000 square metres (22,000 sq ft) of display space. It is connected to the main building by a glassed-walled passageway.

Storehouses have been placed on view since the 16th century. However, the Focke Museum is the first institution in Europe to revive the idea in a long time. On these two floors, visitors can see items in the museum's collection that were previously hidden away; a wide variety of items are packed together much more closely than in display spaces. Multimedia stations provide information, and there are also opportunities for play and for trying things out.

=== Lifeboat ===
The decommissioned lifeboat Paul Denker, the first all-aluminium craft built for the German Maritime Search and Rescue Service, is on display in the courtyard between the main building and the extension. She was retired in July 2005.

=== Haus Riensberg ===
Haus Riensberg was built in the second half of the 18th century and was the main house of the Riensberg estate. It has been used by the museum since 1953 and was declared a protected landmark in 1973. It currently houses the museum's displays on residential life in Bremen, European glass and the children's museum and toy collection. The displays are especially rich in furniture of the 16th to the 20th centuries, including Heinrich Vogeler's 1906 design for "a young lady's room", a masterwork of the German Jugendstil, and furniture by Rudolf Alexander Schröder. In the attic is the Studio Focke, an experimental space for children and teenagers.

=== Eichenhof ===
The Eichenhof is the former barn of the Riensberg estate. It is thatched with reeds and houses the department of pre-history and early history, covering the cultural development of the region from 350,000 BCE until the 8th century. Amongst other topics, displays cover Stone Age farming cultures, archaeological finds resulting from excavating and gravel dredging in the Weser, and Bronze and Iron Age grave finds. There is a large amount of material related to the Saxon period, with exhibits in particular from the Migration Age and early medieval cemetery at Mahndorf. This building also includes a Renaissance bronze tournament helmet found in the Lesum.

=== Haus Mittelsbüren ===
Haus Mittlesbüren is a farmhouse, built in 1586 or 1587. In the late 1950s the village of Mittelsbüren in the Burglesum section of north Bremen (previously a rural area) was cleared for a new steel works operated by Klöckner (Klöckner Stahl). The farmhouse was dismantled in 1961 and rebuilt on the museum grounds in 1964. It has been a protected landmark since 1973.

The house is used to display information on the life and daily work of rural families in the Büren area, including house construction, flax preparation, seafaring and river fishing, as well as the movement of industry into rural areas.

=== Tarmstedt barn ===
The barn from a farm in Tarmstedt was erected by Johann and Tebke Böschen in 1803, according to the inscription on it. It was moved to the museum grounds in 1973/74 and is used to display farm tools and exhibits relating to agriculture, including cattle, dairy and arable farming, beekeeping, haying, peat cutting, slaughtering and rural transport.

=== Park ===
The museum is set in 4.5 hectares (11 acres) of parkland, with the different buildings being connected by gardens with sculptures and sundials. The oldest elements in the park are four tall lime trees in front of Haus Riensberg which were probably planted when the house was remodelled in 1768, and a marble statue of the goddess Terra which has been in the park since 1810. The park includes water features and both a botanical collection with many exotics and a farm garden at Haus Mittelsbüren displaying indigenous flowers and herbs. Open-air concerts are held in the park in summer.

=== Oberneuland Mill ===
The Oberneuland Mill, in the Oberneuland section of Bremen, is an external site belonging to the museum. It is a smock mill of the gallery type built in 1848, and has been a protected landmark since 1973. The mill has a permanent exhibit on the process of making bread from corn and an educational programme.

== Special exhibitions and events ==
The museum also offers special exhibitions on topics relating to the history of Bremen, crafts and design, and photography and other arts. For example, a 1987 exhibition of works by Wilhelm Wagenfeld led to the creation of a foundation and a permanent exhibit elsewhere in Bremen, and there is a regular summer exhibition of photography, in 2010 of work by the photojournalist Robert Lebeck and in 2014 of 300 images by Sebastião Salgado under the title Exodus. Tours for varying age groups and lectures are held.
