= Ludwig Schmid-Reutte =

German naturalist painter (1863–1909)

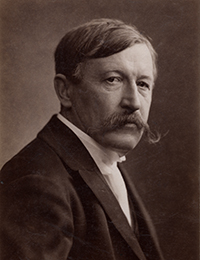
Ludwig Schmid-Reutte (date unknown)

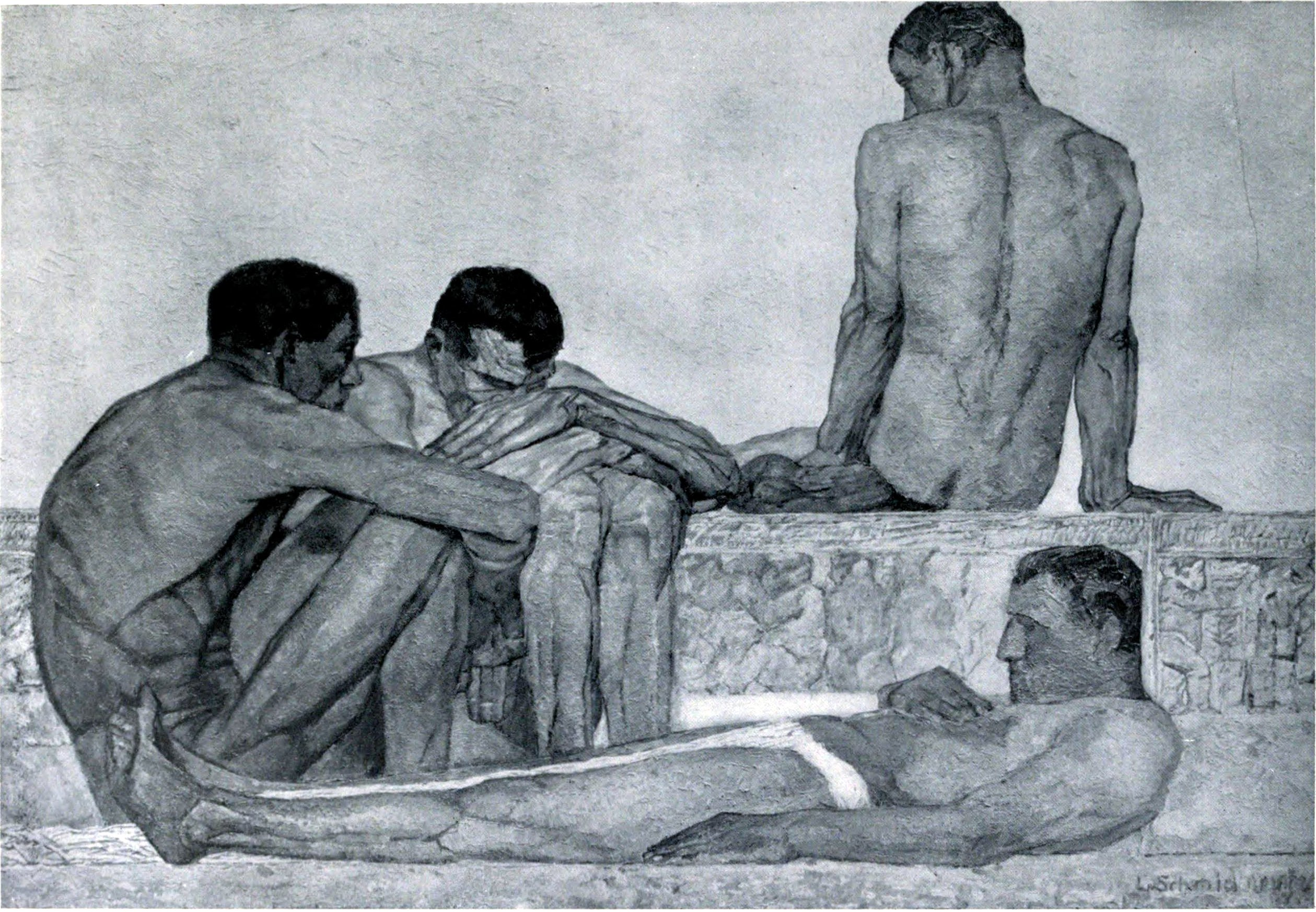
Ruhende Fluchtlinge ("Refugees resting") (1908)

Ludwig Schmid-Reutte (13 January 1863 - 13 November 1909) was a Germany naturalist painter.

== Biography ==
Ludwig Schmid-Reutte was born in Lechaschau, a mountain village to the west of Garmisch and Innsbruck. Franz Anton Schmid, his father, was a peasant farmer who also worked as a builder and stone mason. Ludwig attended school locally and then moved across the nearby border into Bavaria (which had recently been subsumed into an enlarged German state) and worked as a "Builder's henchmen" ("Maurer-Handlanger"). In 1878 he was able to enroll at the Academy of Fine Arts, Munich where he was a pupil of fellow Tirolean Franz Defregger and of Ludwig von Löfftz. Lovis Corinth was a contemporary. Following his student years his first commissions involved producing paintings for churches.

at the start of 1890 he teamed up with Friedrich Fehr in order to set up a private drawing and painting school in Munich. During his time at the Academy of Fine Arts Schmid-Reutte had pursued his artistic study with particular intensity in the anatomical dissecting room, and some sources describe the painting school as a specialist arts school for anatomy drawing. The academy acquired a good reputation, also providing instruction of life models to students of the ladies' academy at the Munich (women) artists' association ("Münchner Künstlerinnenverein"). During the 1890s in Munich he was also giving private art lessons. One young pupil was the painter-sportsman Julius Seyler.

In 1899 Schmid-Reutte and Fehr accepted professorships at the Academy of Fine Arts, Karlsruhe. Schmid-Reutte was popular with students, sometimes attracting classes of up to 60. Among his more notable students were Hermann Föry, Wilhelm Gerstel and Hans Meid. Because of a nervous disorder he was obliged to resign in 1907. Two years later he died at the "Heil- und Pflegeanstalt Illenau für psychisch Kranke" (psychological spa institution) at Achern (Baden).

== Work ==
After Schmid-Reutte had left behind him the influence of his Munich teacher Danegger and moved on from mainstream painting he turned increasingly to representations of the human body. His stylised monumentalist and symbolic nudes attracted considerable notice in the arts world, even if the overall number of his own pieces remained small. He is believed to have completed barely 50 works.

== Honors ==
In 1904 he was awarded the Knight's Cross First Class of the Zähringer Lion.
