= Olga Bontjes van Beek =

German sculptor, painter and dancer (1896-1995)

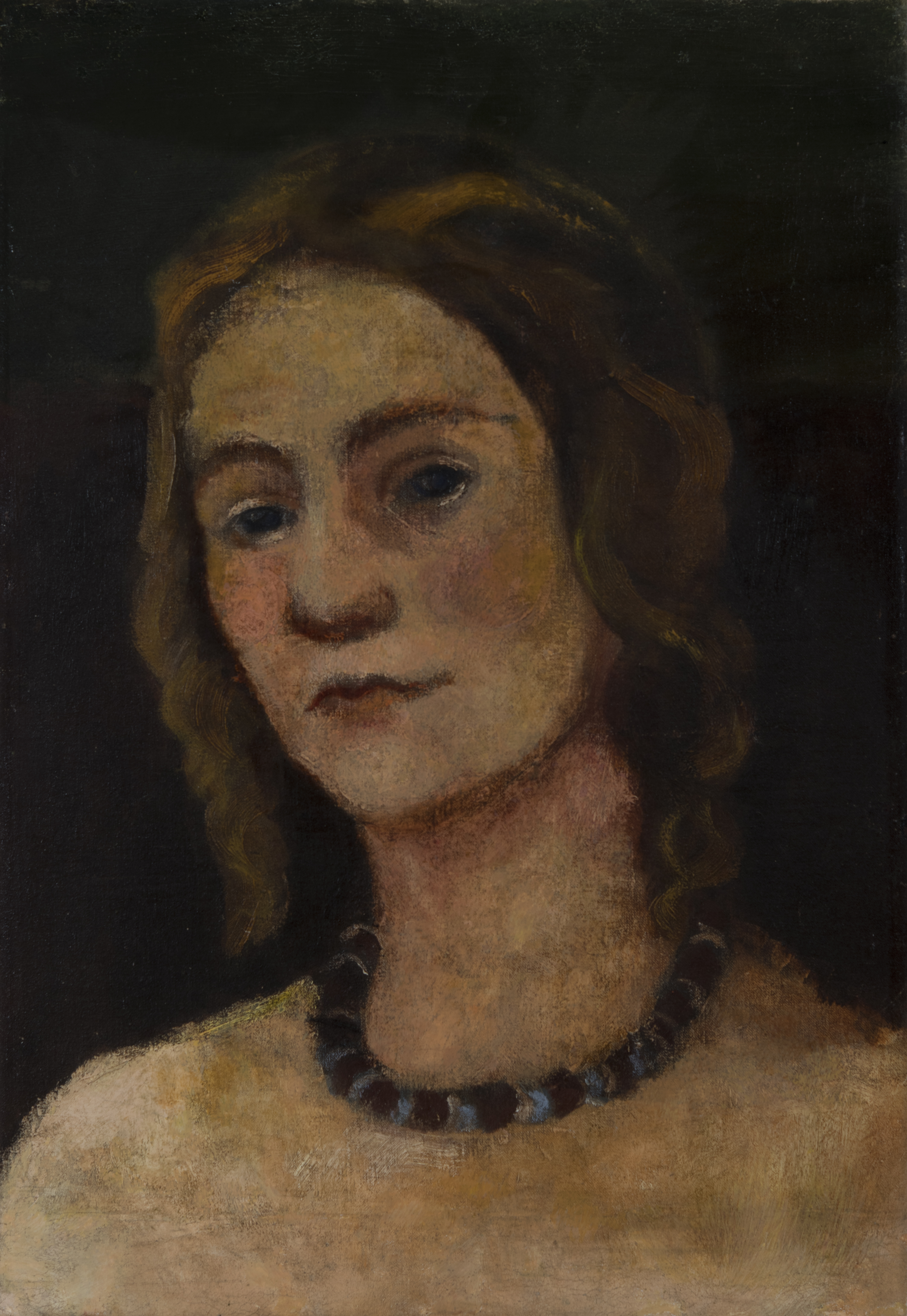
- Olga Bons van Beek, Self-portrait with a necklace, 1920
- Born: 14 August 1896; Fischerhude
- Died: 12 February 1995 (aged 98); Fischerhude
- Occupations: sculptor, painter, Dancer

Olga Bontjes van Beek (née Breling; 14 August 1896 in Fischerhude – 12 February 1995 in Fischerhude) was a German dancer, sculptor, and painter.

== Biography ==
Olga Bontjes van Beek was born into an artistic family as the youngest daughter of the painter Heinrich Breling. One of her sisters was Louise Breling, who later became Otto Modersohn's third wife. In 1914, she began her dance training at the Elisabeth Duncan School in Darmstadt. She subsequently undertook numerous tours as a dancer both in Germany and abroad, sometimes accompanied by the pianist Walter Gieseking. As a student of expressionist dance under Sent M’Ahesa, she undertook extensive tours in 1919 and 1920 with her dance partner Jan Bontjes van Beek, whom she married in 1920. Together they had three children: Cato, Mietje, and Tim.

From 1925 onward, she devoted herself to painting and studied under the painter Fritz Mühsam in Paris. She was friends with, among others, Bernhard Hoetger, for whom she frequently modeled, the painter Heinrich Vogeler, and the philosopher Theodor Lessing. On her travels, she met Kurt Schwitters and Joachim Ringelnatz. After the Second World War, she fought for twelve years in court against the state of Lower Saxony for the rehabilitation of her daughter Cato, who had been executed in 1943 as a member of the Red Orchestra in Berlin-Plötzensee, and won the case.

She worked as a painter and sculptor until her death. Her works were exhibited extensively. Three years after her death, a documentary film by Sara Fruchtmann and Konstanze Radziwill was released, which illuminated the artist's life and work.

== Literature ==
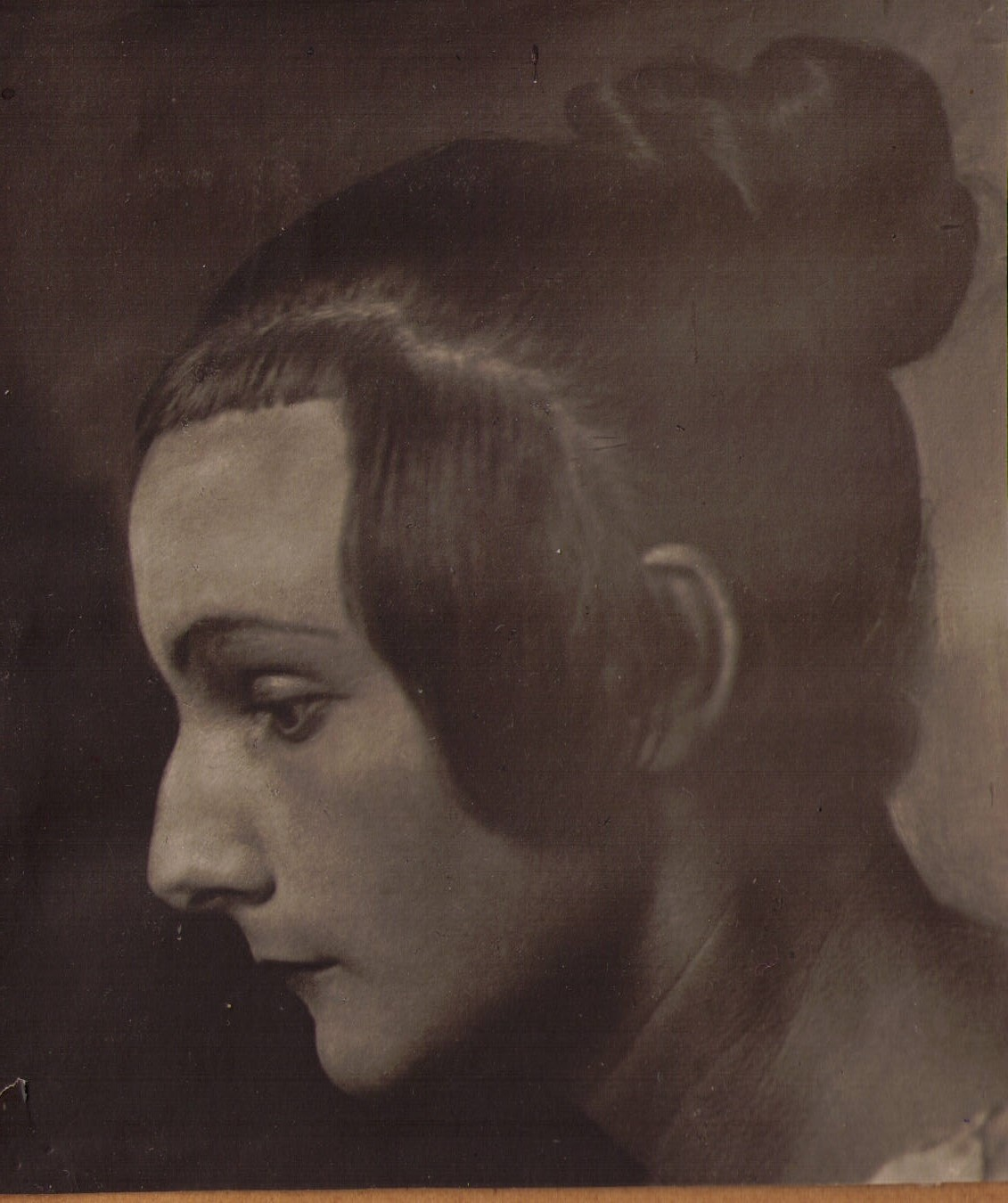
- Olga Breling with dance hairstyle, 1920
  Susanne Triebel: Olga Bontjes van Beek – ein Porträt. Vom Tanz zur Malerei. In: Weltkunst. 57. Jg. Nr. 7, 1. April 1987, S. 1026f.
- Olga Bontjes van Beek: Künstlerin und Künstlermodell – eine Ausstellung der Kunstsammlungen Böttcherstraße. Bremen 1996, ISBN 978-3-9804677-1-1.
- Olga Bontjes van Beek: Gemälde. Ausstellung zum 90. Geburtstag der Künstlerin in der Kunsthalle Bremen. 1986.
- Simone Ewald: Olga Breling. In: Bewegte Bronze. Tanzplastiken von Bernhard Hoetger. Paula Modersohn-Becker Museum, Bremen 2012, ISBN 978-3-9810296-9-7, S. 28–41.
- Gerd Presler: Brief an Olga Bontjes van Beek, In: Gemälde. Ausstellung zum 90. Geburtstag der Künstlerin, Kunsthalle Bremen 1986, o. S.
- Barbara Delia Johnson: Bontjes van Beek, Olga. In: Heike Schlichting (Hrsg.): Lebensläufe zwischen Elbe und Weser. Ein biographisches Lexikon. Bd. 3. Stade 2018, S. 41–45.
- Ingrid von der Dollen: Malerinnen der Sammlung Joseph Hierling. Bildkunst der "verschollenen Generation", Edition Joseph Hierling, Tutzing 2018.
- Werner Irro: Kunstort, Gesprächsort, Erinnerungsort. Der Kontakt zu Olga Bontjes van Beek und Christian Modersohn. in: Helmut und Loki Schmidt-Stiftung (Hrsg.): Kanzlers Kunst: Die private Sammlung von Helmut und Loki Schmidt. Hamburg 2020, S. 84–95.
- Reiner Lehberger: Fischerhude und Olga Bontjes van Beek: Kunst, Musik und Politik. In: Reiner Lehberger: Helmut Schmidt am Klavier. Ein Leben mit Musik. Hamburg 2021, S. 59–86.
- Olga Bontjes van Beek - das malerische Werk. Ausstellung im Kunstverein Fischerhude in Buthmanns Hof, 12. Januar bis 1. Juni 2025
- Iris Radisch: Die Malerin Olga Bontjes van Beek, deren Bilder Helmut Schmidt als seelische Heimat bezeichnete, DIE ZEIT, 15/2025 vom 9. April 2025.
