= Jan Bontjes van Beek =

German sculptor

Professor Jan Bontjes van Beek
- Jan Bontjes van Beek examining a piece in 1953
- Born: 18 January 1899; Vejle, Denmark
- Died: 5 September 1969 (aged 70)
- Education: Seger Institute
- Relatives: Olga Bontjes van Beek

Jan Bontjes van Beek (born 18 January 1899 in Vejle, Denmark; † 5 September 1969 in Berlin) was a German ceramicist, sculptor and dancer.

== Life ==
Between 1905 and 1915 Bontjes van Beek attended the elementary school and real high school in Uerdingen. He became a German national in 1907. Between 1915 and 1919, Beek worked as a volunteer in the Imperial German Navy. After his volunteer service he spent several months working in the artists colony in Fischerhude and Worpswede where he met artists, sculptors like Heinrich Vogeler, Otto Modersohn, Bernhard Hoetger, Hans Heinz Stuckenschmidt and others. In 1920 he met and married to Olga Bontjes van Beek, née Breling, who was the daughter of artist Heinrich Breling. She was a dancer and also artist. The couple had three children. Cato (1920), Mietje (1922) and Tim (1925).

He completed his training as a potter in Undenheim from 1921 to 1922, he then completed advanced study at the Seger Institute in Berlin, the former chemical and technical research institute of the Royal Porcelain Manufactory, named after the silicate chemist Hermann August Seger. With his sister-in-law, the sculptor Amelie Breling, they established a ceramics workshop in Fischerhude in 1922. After several stays abroad to study in Paris, Prague, Bontjes van Beek worked in 1932, initially on an order from the architect Fritz Höger in Velten near Berlin, to produce ceramics for the new church on Hohenzollernplatz in Wilmersdorf.

Bontjes van Beek second marriage was to architect Rahel Maria Weisbach, whom he married in 1933. Together they established a ceramic studio in Charlottenburg in the same year. It was completely destroyed by a bomb attack in 1943. He had a further four children with Rahel, they were film-maker Digne Meller Marcovicz, siblings Jan-Barent and Sebastian and the couples daughter, Julia Schmidt-Ott.

On 20 September 1942 Cato Bontjes van Beek was arrested by the Abwehr for being suspected of being part of the German resistance group that was known as the Red Orchestra by the Abwehr. Under the German tradition, where family members were deemed to share responsibility for the crime, known as Sippenhaft, Jan Bontjes van Beek was also arrested. On 18 January 1943, Cato was found guilty at the Reichskriegsgericht (military court) of abetting a conspiracy to commit high treason and sentenced to death. A clemency appeal of the 22-year-old was personally denied by Adolf Hitler, though the court itself had suggested a reprieve. She was guillotined on 5 August 1943 at Plötzensee Prison in Berlin. Bontjes van Beek was released after three months in prison for lack of evidence, but conscripted into the Wehrmacht in 1944 and deployed as a soldier on the Eastern Front. In 1945 he was taken prisoner by the Soviets.

After surviving the Second World War, Bontjes van Beek started an academic career initially as a lecturer in ceramics at the Berlin University of the Arts. In 1947, he was appointed director of the Weißensee Academy of Art Berlin, a position he held until 1950. He left abruptly due to new state regulations that affected his work. In 1950, together with Alfred Ungewiß he established a production facility in the village of Dehme, located close to Bad Oeynhausen. to produce ceramics. From 1953 to 1967 Bontjes van Beek was available for consultation for the production new pieces at his in Dehme.

In 1960, Bontjes van Beek was promoted to Professor of Ceramics at the University of Fine Arts of Hamburg and Director of the ceramics course, a position he held until 1966. From 1964, Van Beek was a member was the Academy of Arts, Berlin. In 1965 Bontjes van Beek became a member of the International Academy of Ceramics (L'Académie Internationale de la Céramique), Geneva and in the same year won Grand Art Prize of the Berliner Kunstpreis in Berlin.

== Exhibitions ==
- 1935 Grassi Museum Leipzig.
- 1936 Leicester Galleries London, together with Henry Moore.
- 1946 Exhibition participation in the Gerd Rosen Gallery in Berlin
- 1964 Museum for Arts and Crafts Hamburg
- 1978 Academy of the Arts Berlin
- 1999 Museum of Applied Arts Gera and Charlottenburg Palace (Ceramic Museum Berlin)

== Awards and honours ==
- 1938 Gold medal at the Milan Triennial
- 1962 Silver Medal, 3rd International Ceramic Exhibition
- 1963 Prize of the Cultural Authority of the Free and Hanseatic City of Hamburg
- 1965 Art Prize Berlin

== Literature ==
- Marcovicz, Digne Meller (2011). Töpfe - Menschen - Leben Berichte zu Jan Bontjes van Beek (in German) (1st ed.). Berlin: Hentrich & Hentrich. ISBN 978-3-942271-31-8. OCLC 760087306.
- Jakobson, Hans-Peter; Ellwanger, Volker; van Beek, Jan Bontjes (1999). Jan Bontjes van Beek : Keramiker; 1899-1969; [Gera, Museum für Angewandte Kunst, 26. April bis 22. Juni 1999, Berlin, Förderverein Berlin, Keramikmuseum, Schloß Charlottenburg, 1. August bis 26. September]; [Ausstellung zum 100. Geburtstag Jan Bontjes van Beek (1899-1969)] (in German). Jena: Bussert und Stadeler. ISBN 9783932906077. OCLC 906840014.
