= Peter Kulka =

German architect (1937–2024)

- Born: 20 July 1937; Dresden, Gau Saxony, Germany
- Died: 5 February 2024 (aged 86); Dresden, Saxony, Germany
- Education: Weißensee Academy of Art Berlin
- Occupation: Architect

Peter Kulka (20 July 1937 – 5 February 2024) was a German architect.

== Biography ==
Born in Dresden on 20 July 1937, Kulka completed a masonry apprenticeship and attended the Weißensee Academy of Art Berlin alongside Selman Selmanagić. He fled from East Germany in 1965. He began working as an independent architect in Berlin with Hans Scharoun in 1969 before setting up his own office in Cologne ten years later. In 1980, he teamed up with Hans Schilling to design religious buildings. From 1986 to 1992, he was a professor of structural design at RWTH Aachen University.

After the Reunification of Germany, Kulka moved back to Dresden and opened his second office. He took part in the reconstruction of institutions in the former East Germany, including the Landtag of Saxony. A renovation project awarded by the Architekturpreis der Stadt Leipzig in 1999 was that of a villa which houses the Galerie für Zeitgenössische Kunst Leipzig. He was one of the founding members of the Saxon Academy of Arts in 1995, the same year in which he joined the Academy of Arts, Berlin. In 2010, he joined the North Rhine-Westphalian Academy of Sciences, Humanities and the Arts.

Peter Kulka died in Dresden on 5 February 2024, at the age of 86.
