= Ali Sarmini =

Syrian painter

Dr. Ali Sarmini (Arabic: علي سرميني 'ali Sarmyni), is a Syrian painter, best known for his work Quneitra on Remains painted on parts of an Israeli Air Force F-4 Phantom shot down over Syrian territories, in about 1972.

== Biography ==
Born in 1943, in Aleppo, Syria, he studied Fine Arts in University of Damascus, graduating in 1972, and where, two years later, he began lecturing in Fine Arts. Sarmini later achieved a doctorate in Fine Arts from the Weißensee Academy of Art Berlin in Germany. From 1981 to 1991 he was Vice-Dean, from 1993 to 2001, Dean of the Faculty of Fine Arts, at the University of Damascus. He attained a professorship degree in 1993.

Sarmini has exhibited internationally, including in Germany and Russia.

== "Quneitra on Remains" ==
"Quneitra on Remains"

Sarmini's three art work pieces (from different parts of an F-4 Phantom) were created in 1974, and were presented the same year to Syrian president Hafez al-Assad. It is believed that the Syrian president subsequently gifted one part to the USSRs ambassador to Syria, Nuratdin Muhitdinov, and another to US diplomat Henry Kissinger. The fate of the third piece was unknown until recently, when it was reported that it had been rediscovered in Moscow, and put up for auction. It was presented on 18 July 2007 to the Moscow House of Nationalities, by author and Syrian ambassador to Russia, Hasan Rische.
