= Alexandra Kiesel =

German fashion designer

Alexandra Kiesel (born 1982) is a German fashion designer based in Berlin. She is known for her modular, colour focused approach to fashion design and for winning the 2011 Designer for Tomorrow by Peek & Cloppenburg Düsseldorf award, which was presented during Mercedes-Benz Fashion Week Berlin under the patronage of Marc Jacobs.

== Early life and education ==
Kiesel was born near Leipzig, Germany. Before studying fashion design, she completed a tailor apprenticeship in Leipzig. She later studied fashion design at the Kunsthochschule Berlin Weißensee, graduating in 2011.

== Career ==
Kiesel gained broader attention in 2011 when she won the Designer for Tomorrow by Peek & Cloppenburg Düsseldorf award for her graduate collection, Baukasten Individualisten 12/6/24. The award was presented during Mercedes-Benz Fashion Week Berlin, with Marc Jacobs serving as patron and jury chair. As part of the award programme, Kiesel received support for a solo presentation at the following Mercedes-Benz Fashion Week Berlin. In January 2012, she presented her first runway collection in Berlin. Jacobs described the collection as colourful and wearable, while Frankfurter Rundschau reported that her first solo show at the Brandenburg Gate included around 30 outfits under the title Support your local heroes.

With her collaboration Modni Konstruktor - Vom Bauen von Mode performance in St. Petersburg had place.

== Awards and recognition ==
- 2011: Winner of the Designer for Tomorrow by Peek & Cloppenburg Düsseldorf award.
