= Heinrich Breling =

German painter

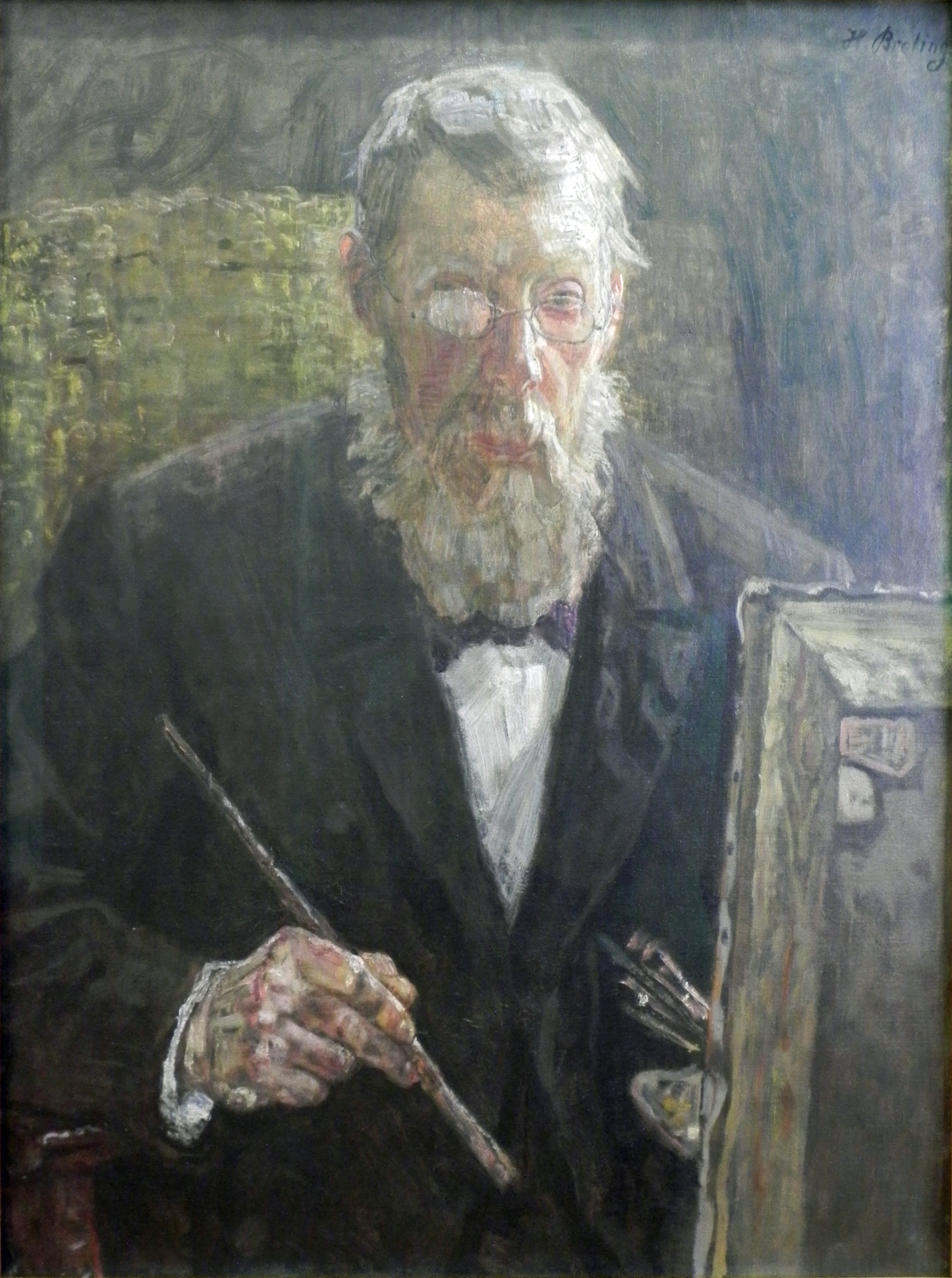
Self-portrait with easel (c.1911)

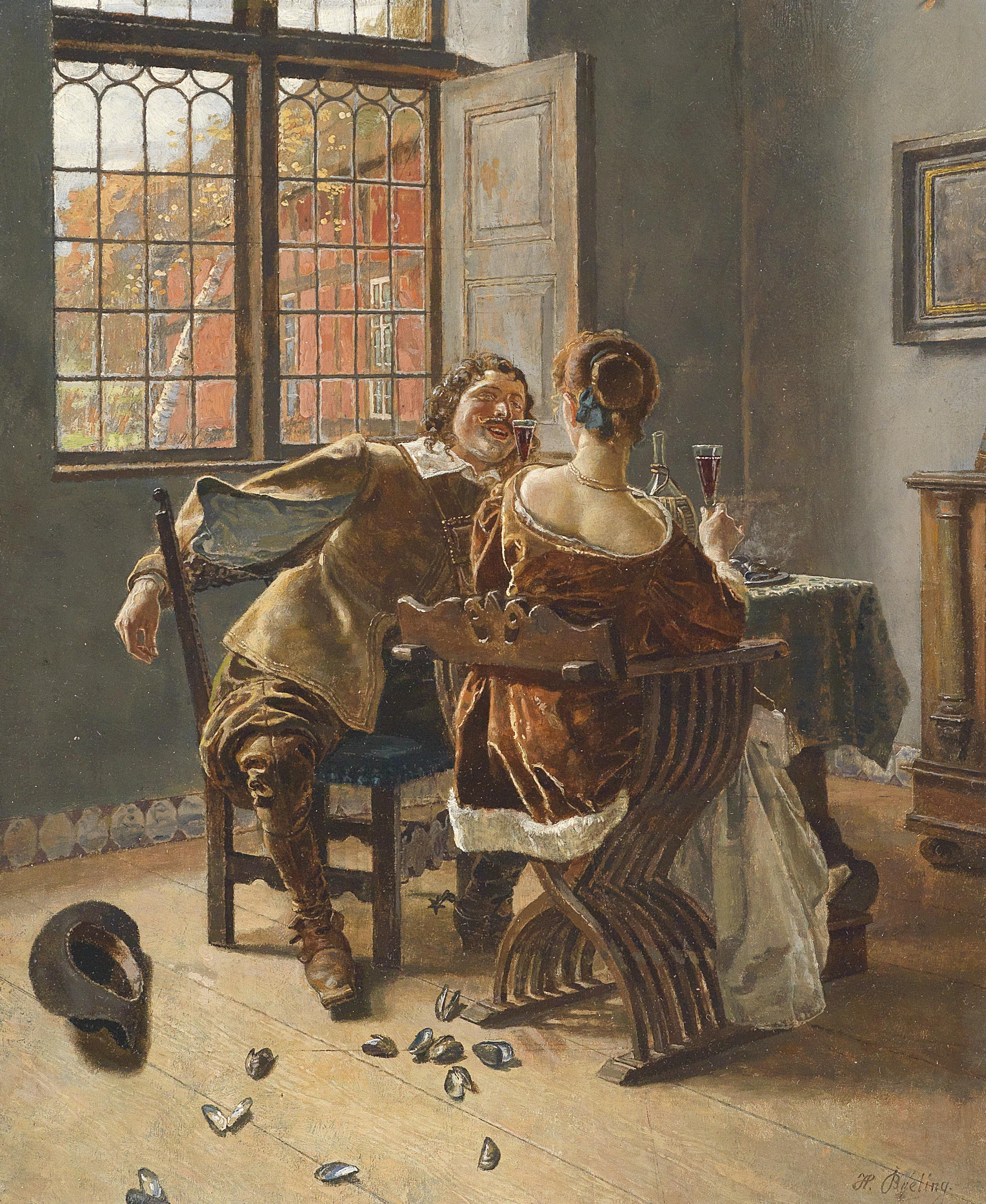
The Feast (date unknown)

Heinrich Christoph Gottlieb Breling (14 October 1849 – 6 September 1914) was a German painter of historical and genre scenes. He was the first artist in what would later become known as the "Artists' Colony" at Fischerhude.

== Life and work ==
He was born in Burgdorf as the son of a border customs officer and guard and spent his childhood in the village of Fischerhude where he practiced drawing while herding the farmers' geese. From 1864 to 1869, he studied art at the Hannover Polytechnical Institute on a royal scholarship from King George V of Hannover (1819–1878). After serving in the 1870/71 Franco-Prussian War, he went to Munich, where he became a student of Wilhelm von Diez. In Munich he also met and married Amalie Mayer (1856–1933), the daughter of the wine merchant and restaurateur Joseph Mayer, also known as "Tenor-Mayer" because of his wonderful voice. Amalie, who had inherited her father's musical talents would bring music into the family life.

In 1879, Breling's finely executed paintings came to the attention of King Ludwig II, who would hire him to execute many watercolors of Linderhof Castle and his "secret residences". The king went so far as to order a heated portable shelter built for him, so he could paint outdoors, even in the winter. Breling and King Ludwig developed a close working relationship. In 1883, the King appointed him Royal Professor at the Academy of Fine Arts. Breling had become a well-known and widely respected painter, well able to support his growing family. Four of his daughters were born in Munich.

After Ludwig's mysterious death, Breling returned to Northern Germany and settled in Hanover while spending the summers in Fischerhude, where he turned to impressionism to render his new interest: the men and women of the land pursuing their daily lives. The art world largely ignored these paintings, and with the loss of his generous income from the king, Breling had to face the new reality that he was not earning. His desperation is apparent from a request for a military pension he made to the local military district commander in 1911, describing himself as a "Hannoveraner Schlachtenmaler" (Hanoverian battle painter). Since 1897, he had been taking on commissions from various regiments, including his own, to paint realistic military scenes from battles they had fought. The paintings had to be historically accurate and included actual portraits of the officers who participated. These often very large paintings paid well and kept his family afloat. Indeed, in 1907, when he built his house with studio in Fischerhude, he was able to finance its construction with the last of his battle paintings.

In 1908, Heinrich moved with wife and six daughters into their new house in Fischerhude, right on the Bredenau, the long street that leads into the open fields. His great-grandchildren still live there. Here in his paradise, he created his best paintings. But he only had a few years left. He died of heart failure in 1914.

Four of his six daughters have continued their parents' artistic legacy. Amelie Breling (1876–1966) began with painting before she became a sculptor. She mentored the noted ceramicist Jan Bontjes van Beek (1899–1959) while he was young. Together, they founded the Fischerhude Kunstkeramik (Fischerhude Ceramic Arts Studio). Louise Modersohn-Breling (1882–1950) began as an opera singer but turned to painting after she became the third wife of painter Otto Modersohn. Josefine (Jossie) Breling-Schultze-Ritter (1889–1978) was a piano teacher, accompanist and composer. She married the Kapellmeister Hans Schultze-Ritter. Olga Bontjes van Beek (1896–1995) began as a dancer. After marrying the ceramicist Jan Bontjes van Beek and had children, she became a painter.

== Further reading/related books ==
- Barbara Delia Johnson, Heinrich Breling und seine Töchter. Atelier im Bauernhaus, Fischerhude (2021) (biography with illustrations).
- Künstler in Fischerhude (ed. Jürgen Schultze, photographs by Lars Lohrisch), Bremen, Brockkamp Verlag (1984),
- Jean Louis Schlim, Ludwig II. – Traum und Technik. MünchenVerlag, Munich 2010, ISBN 978-3-937090-43-6 (with watercolors by Breling).
