= Dehme =

- Village

- Location within Germany
- Coordinates: 52°14′3″N 8°49′39″E
- Country: Germany
- State: North Rhine-Westphalia
- District: Minden-Lübbecke
- Town: Bad Oeynhausen

Population
  - Total: 3,294
- Website: http://www.dehme.net/

Dehme is a village near the town of Bad Oeynhausen in Germany. It is part of the District Minden-Lübbecke, Regierungsbezirk Detmold.

The village is located at the south side of the Wiehen Hills and the west bank of the river Weser.

The first written mention of Dehme was in 1088, when Bishop Benno II of Osnabrück referred to "Dehem" in his will.

The DENIOS AG is based in the former brickworks which closed in 1984.

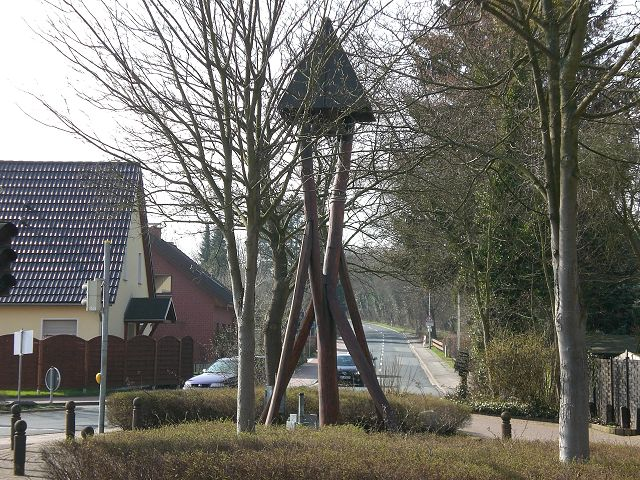
To the 900-year existence reerected belfry with village bell

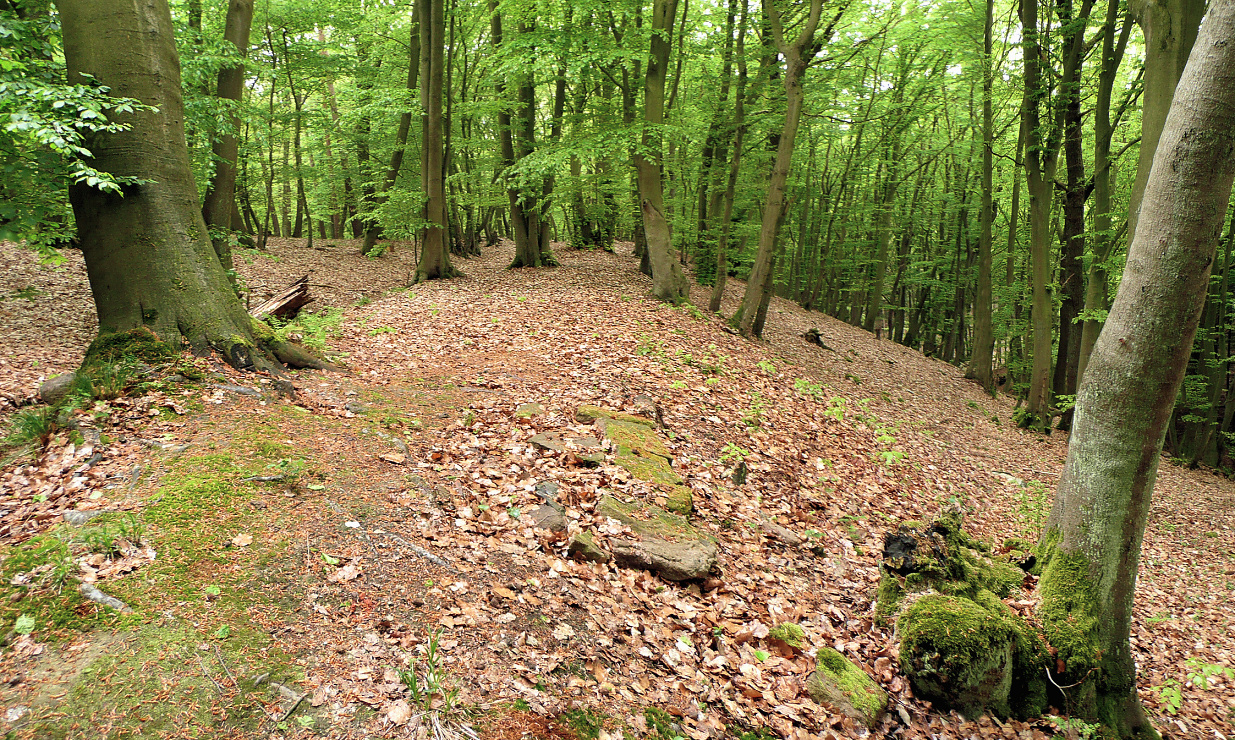
Dehmer Burg
