= Louise Breling =

German painter

Louise Modersohn-Breling
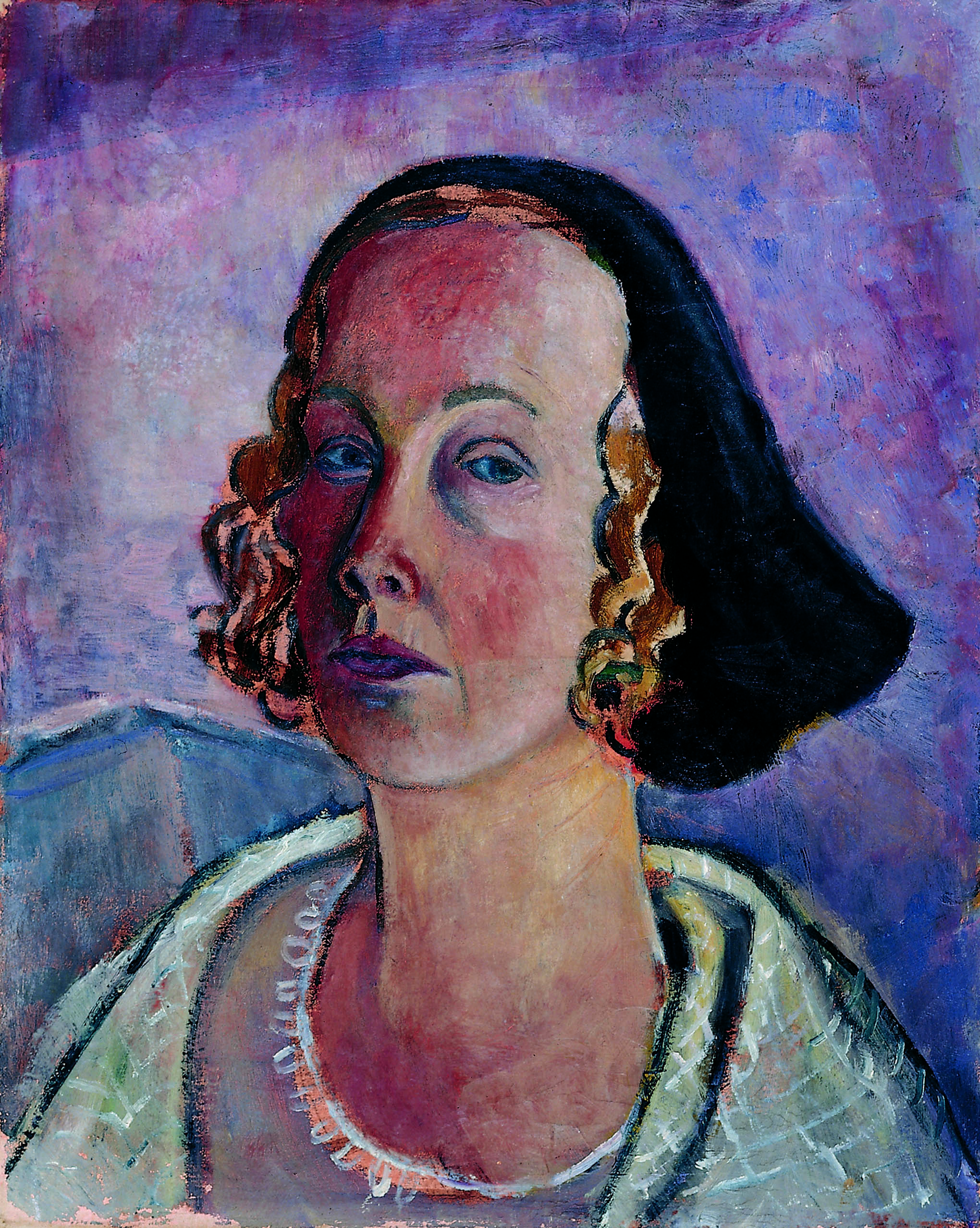
- Born: Louise Breling; March 3, 1883; Munich, Germany
- Died: September 17, 1950 (aged 67); Bad Hindelang, Germany
- Known for: Painting
- Spouse: Otto Modersohn

Louise Modersohn-Breling (March 3, 1883 – September 17, 1950) was a German painter.

Modersohn-Breling nee Breling was born on March 3, 1883 in Munich, Germany. She was the daughter of Heinrich Christoph Gottlieb Breling, the second oldest of six children. She was trained as a singer and performed opera and oratorio. She ended her singing career in 1910, about the time she married Otto Modersohn. She was the third wife of Modersohn with whom she had two children.

Breling died on September 17, 1950 in Bad Hindelang, Germany.
