= Selman Selmanagić =

German architect

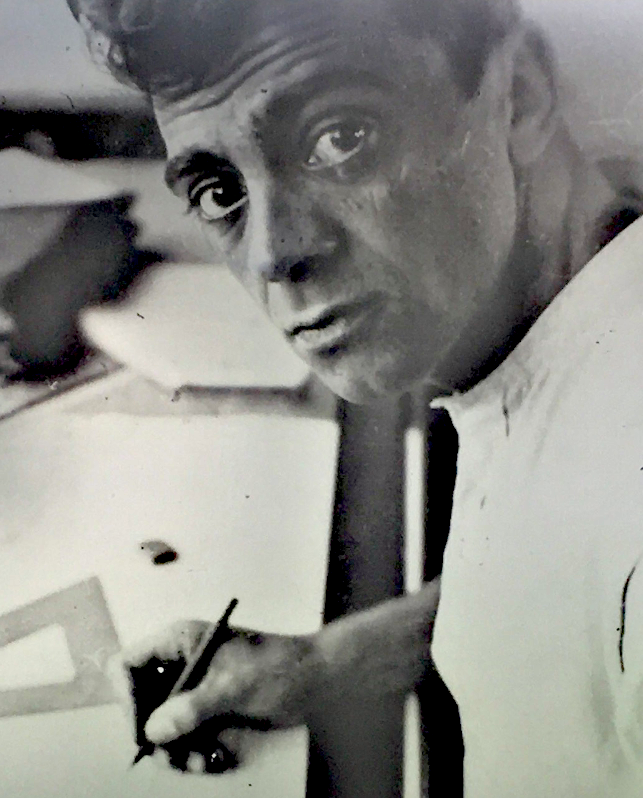
- Born: April 25, 1905; Srebrenica, Condominium of Bosnia and Herzegovina
- Died: May 7, 1986 (aged 81); East Berlin, German Democratic Republic
- Occupation: Architect

Signature
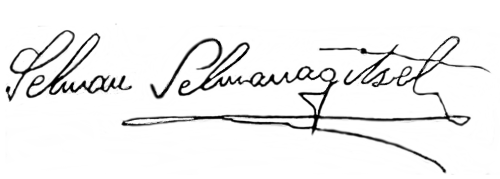

Selman Selmanagić (25 April 1905 – 7 May 1986) was a Bosnian-German architect and long-time professor at the Weißensee Academy of Art Berlin who worked extensively for the government of East Germany.

== Biography ==
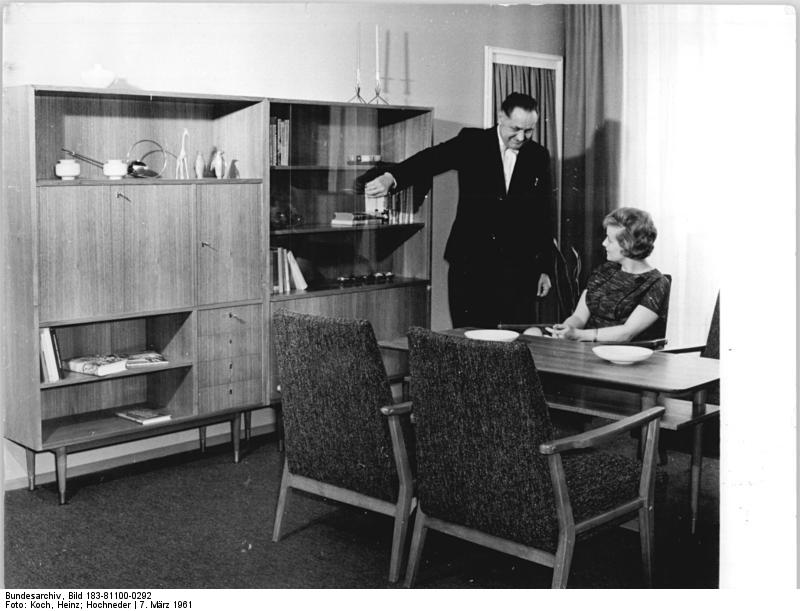
Wall unit, designed by Selmanagić

Selmanagić was born in Srebrenica in eastern Bosnia, then administered by Austria-Hungary, and grew up from 1918 on in the Kingdom of Yugoslavia. After an apprenticeship as a carpenter and his journeyman's examination, Selmanagić first worked as a carpenter in the wagon factory in Sarajevo in 1923-24 and in 1925, after a one-year visit to the Ljubljana School of Crafts, made his master's job as a construction and furniture carpenter. This was followed in 1925/26 his military service. Back in his hometown Srebrenica, he worked from 1926 to 1929 as a carpenter.

Following his great interest in architecture, Selmanagić joined the Bauhaus as the only student from Bosnia, somewhat by chance: during a train journey to Germany, an engineer he met suggested that he should enroll in the school. The Bauhaus, founded in Weimar in 1919, was by the late 1920s a revolutionary center for modernist art, design, and architecture, emphasizing the integration of craft, technology, and social purpose. It attracted avant-garde artists and architects from across Europe and encouraged experimentation, interdisciplinary work, and social engagement in design. Selmanagić began studying there in 1929, immersing himself in this dynamic environment, and graduated in 1932 with Bauhaus Diploma No. 100, signed by Ludwig Mies van der Rohe and Ludwig Hilberseimer. By 1931 Selmanagić was not only a rising star in architecture, but also a member of the German Communist Party.

Like many of his teachers and colleagues at Bauhaus, Selmanagić left Germany with the Nazi seizure of power in 1933. To gain experience, he worked until 1939 in numerous architectural firms throughout Europe and the Middle East: 1933/35 Istanbul, 1935 Jaffa, 1935-38 Jerusalem, first as a freelancer with Richard Kauffmann, later as an independent architect. Study trips led him in 1935/36, among others, to Turkey, to Egypt and 1938 to Italy. Writing to a friend in late 1930s, Selmanagić described his strange position as a Communist & Muslim architect in an increasingly divided land, having Arabs and Jews as competing clients. "I saw that [belonging] depends on outer form. If I wear a fez they think I'm Muslim; if I don't, they don't.. I reject all theories of races & religions, as I know this just stems from general capitalist developments.. But to live, I had to play their theater despite my views".

In 1939, under unclear circumstances, Selmanagić abruptly returned to Berlin, contacting remaining Bauhaus & Rote Kapelle colleagues, and working for city cinemas. His short visit back home to Yugoslavia in 1941 left remarkable images of Srebrenica just before the second world war. After working as a freelancer for Egon Eiermann, he worked in the building department from 1939 to 1942 and then as a film architect at UFA until 1945. During these years he participated actively in the anti-fascist resistance struggle.

As Soviets liberated Berlin and established East Germany, Selmanagić was appointed to prominent positions in GDR urban planning studios & academies. In addition to buildings and stadiums, Selmanagić designed iconic East German interiors, from sleek chairs to elegant store counters.

Together with seven other architects, Selmanagić worked in Hans Scharoun's planning collective (Planungskollektiv) in charge for planning of all segments of reconstruction and development of the city in the period from 1945 to 1950. Among the buildings he worked upon are the Berlin Cathedral, Neue Wache, and Humboldt University of Berlin.

He later became responsible for cultural and recreational site planning at the city council of Greater Berlin. In this role, he was among other things responsible for the construction in 1950 of the Walter Ulbricht Stadium, the largest athletic and football stadium in the DDR. In parallel, he was from 1945 architect of the VEB German workshops Dresden-Hellerau. In 1950 he became German and thus received in 1967 the citizenship of the German Democratic Republic.

From 1950 until his retirement, he was head of the Department of Architecture at the Kunsthochschule Berlin-Weißensee. Since 1951 he held a professorship for construction and interior design there.

After retiring in 1970 he toured cities and universities; he was guest lecturer at the Technical University of Graz, where his former colleague from Bauhaus, Hubert Hoffmann (1904-2000) was also teaching. In 1973 he also lectured on the topic of "Architecture of Bauhaus" at the Faculty of Architecture, Construction and Geodesy (FAGG) in Ljubljana.

He died in 1986 in East Berlin and was buried in his hometown Srebrenica.

== Honourings and prizes ==
- 1964 Medal of Merit of the GDR
- 1970 Patriotic Order of Merit in bronze
- 1979 Patriotic Order of Merit in gold
- 1985 Honorary clasp to the Patriotic Order of Merit in gold

== Works (selection) ==
- 1931 House for the parents, near Srebrenica
- 1935-1938 Residential buildings in Jerusalem
- 1946-1950 SED Party School Karl Marx, Kleinmachnow
- 1957-1950 administrative academy Forst Zinna
- 1950 Walter Ulbricht Stadium (since 1973 World Youth Stadium)
- 1956 Expansion of the Kunsthochschule Berlin-Weißensee in Bühringstraße
- 1959-1960 urban planning for Schwedt
- 1975/76 Head of the restoration work at the Bauhaus in Dessau

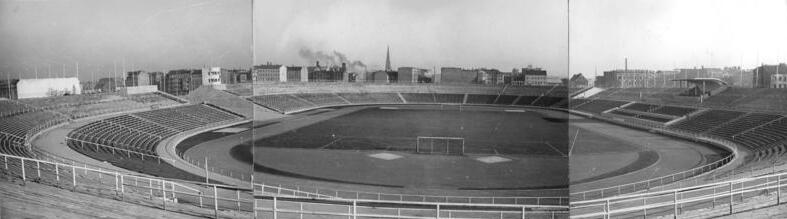
Walter Ulbricht Stadium (since 1973 Stadion der Weltjugend)

== Bibliography ==
- Selman Selmanagić, Kunsthochschule Berlin, Beiträge 10, Festgabe zum 80. Geburtstag am 25. April 1985, 72 S., 66 Abb.
- Michael Kasiske: Selman Selmanagic zum 100. Geburtstag. In: Bauwelt 21, 27 April 2005, 96. Jahrgang
- Aida Abadžić Hodžić, Ines Sonder: Ein kommunistischer Muslim im Lande Israel. In: Bauhaus 2, November 2011, 68–75
- Selman Selmanagić auf bauhaus-online.de (retrieved 19 October 2012)
- Aida Abadžić Hodžić, Selmanagić i Bauhaus (BH 2014, DE 2018)

== Links ==
- Werkverzeichnis, zusammengestellt von der Kunsthochschule Berlin-Weißensee.
- Edin Hejdarpasic, twitter
- Azemina Bruch Selmanagić (2018-04-10). "Beiträge zum Wiederaufbau Berlins" (PDF).
