= Otto Modersohn =

German painter

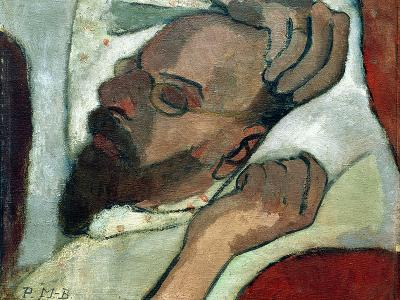
- Otto Modersohn Sleeping, by Paula Modersohn-Becker (1906)
- Born: Friedrich Wilhelm Otto Modersohn; 22 February 1865; Soest, Kingdom of Prussia
- Died: 10 March 1943 (aged 78); Rotenburg, Germany
- Occupation: Painter
- Known for: Plein air, Post-Impressionism
- Spouse(s): Helene Schröder (m. 1897–1900) Paula Modersohn-Becker (m. 1901–1907) Louise Breling (m. 1909)
- Children: Mathilde Modersohn

Friedrich Wilhelm Otto Modersohn (22 February 1865 – 10 March 1943) was a German landscape painter. He was a co-founder of the Art Colony at Worpswede.

== Life ==
Modersohn was born on 22 February 1865 at Soest, Kingdom of Prussia.

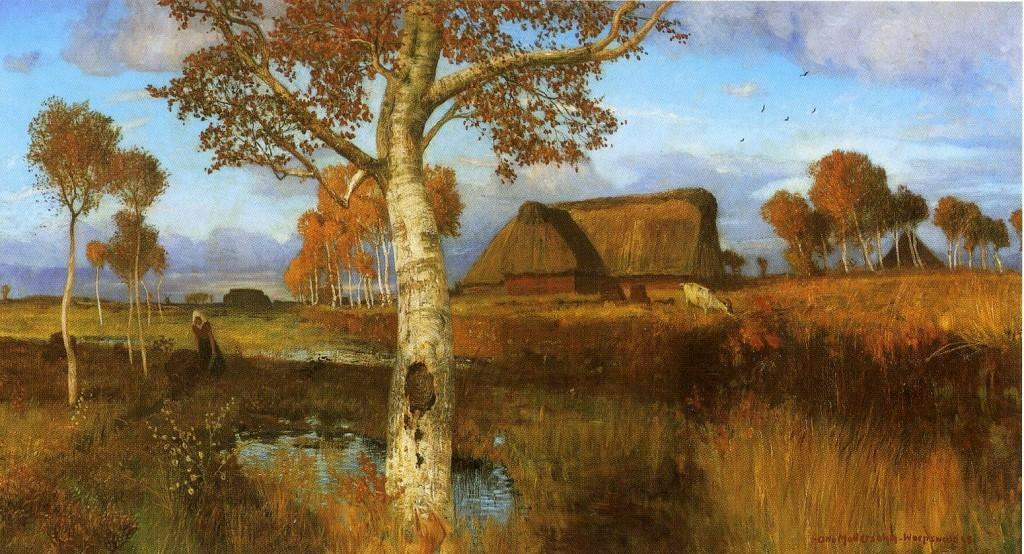
Autumn in the Moor (1895)

In 1884, he began his studies at the Art Academy of Düsseldorf. Four years later, he moved to the Academy of Fine Arts, Karlsruhe, where he studied under Hermann Baisch. In July 1889, he made his first visit to Worpswede with Fritz Mackensen. In August, Hans am Ende followed. They were later joined by Fritz Overbeck (1893) and Heinrich Vogeler (1894); all students from Düsseldorf. In 1895, they presented their first group exhibition at the Kunsthalle Bremen. They were largely panned by the critics, but went on to a major breakthrough at the Munich Glaspalast.

In 1897, the Art Colony was officially established and Modersohn married Helene Schröder (1868-1900), the daughter of a Bremen merchant. Two years later, he resigned from the association, citing his continuing fight for the personal, individual liberty of every artist. Vogeler and Overbeck joined him in leaving. The couple had one daughter, Elsbeth (1898-1984). The next year, his wife died after a long illness. In 1901, he remarried. His new wife, Paula Becker, was also a well-known painter. She died in 1907, of an embolism, shortly after giving birth to their daughter Mathilde "Tille" (1907-1998). At that point, Modersohn felt that he could not remain in Worpswede and moved to Fischerhude, a nearby village. His third wife was Louise Breling, daughter of the painter Heinrich Breling. She was primarily a singer, but painted as well. They had two sons, Ulrich (1913-1943) and Christian, who also became a painter.

In 1911, when the Kunsthalle Bremen purchased Van Gogh's Field with Poppies, Modersohn was the only Worpswede artist to support the museum, concluding that nationalistic sentiments should play no role in the world of art. In the 1920s and early 30s, he and Louise made extensive study trips throughout Germany and, in 1933, he acquired an old farmhouse on the Gailenberg in Bad Hindelang for use as a studio. Three years later, he became blind in his right eye, due to a detached retina. This forced him to remain in his studio rather than paint outdoors. He was awarded the Goethe Medal for Art & Science in 1940. A year before his death, he was persuaded to speak on the subject of visual arts at the Ministry of Public Enlightenment and Propaganda.

He died on 10 March 1943 at Rotenburg.

== Work ==
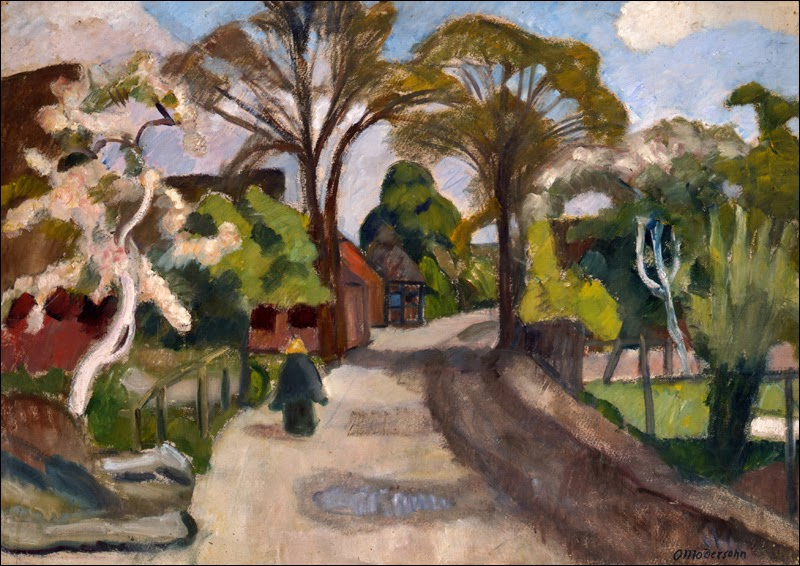
Village Street in Spring (1922)

From 1874 to 1889, he concentrated on small-scale studies and landscapes, painted directly from nature in the Plein Air style of the Barbizon School. After 1889, his search for a truly natural style led gradually to more colorful canvases. Around 1900, he and several other Worpswede artists began doing illustrations and designs for Stollwerck, the German chocolate company.

Artistic interaction with his second wife, Paula, led to the development of a style emphasizing simplicity and humanity, expressed in their maxim "Das Ding an sich in Stimmung" (roughly, "The thing-in-itself in the mood/feeling"). Although his wife's subject matter was vastly different, he considered her work a complement to his.

After World War II, a Modersohn Museum was established in Gailenberg and later relocated to Fischerhude. Another Otto Modersohn Museum showcasing his early work in Westphalia opened in Tecklenburg in 2015.

== Documentary film ==
- So broad and big - The nature of Otto Modersohn, Directed by Carlo Modersohn, narrated by Hanns Zischler, produced by Carlo Modersohn, in cooperation with the Otto Modersohn Museum, 78 min., 2011. (Two-minute trailer on YouTube)
