= Fischerhude =

Coordinates: 53°07′00″N 9°03′20″E

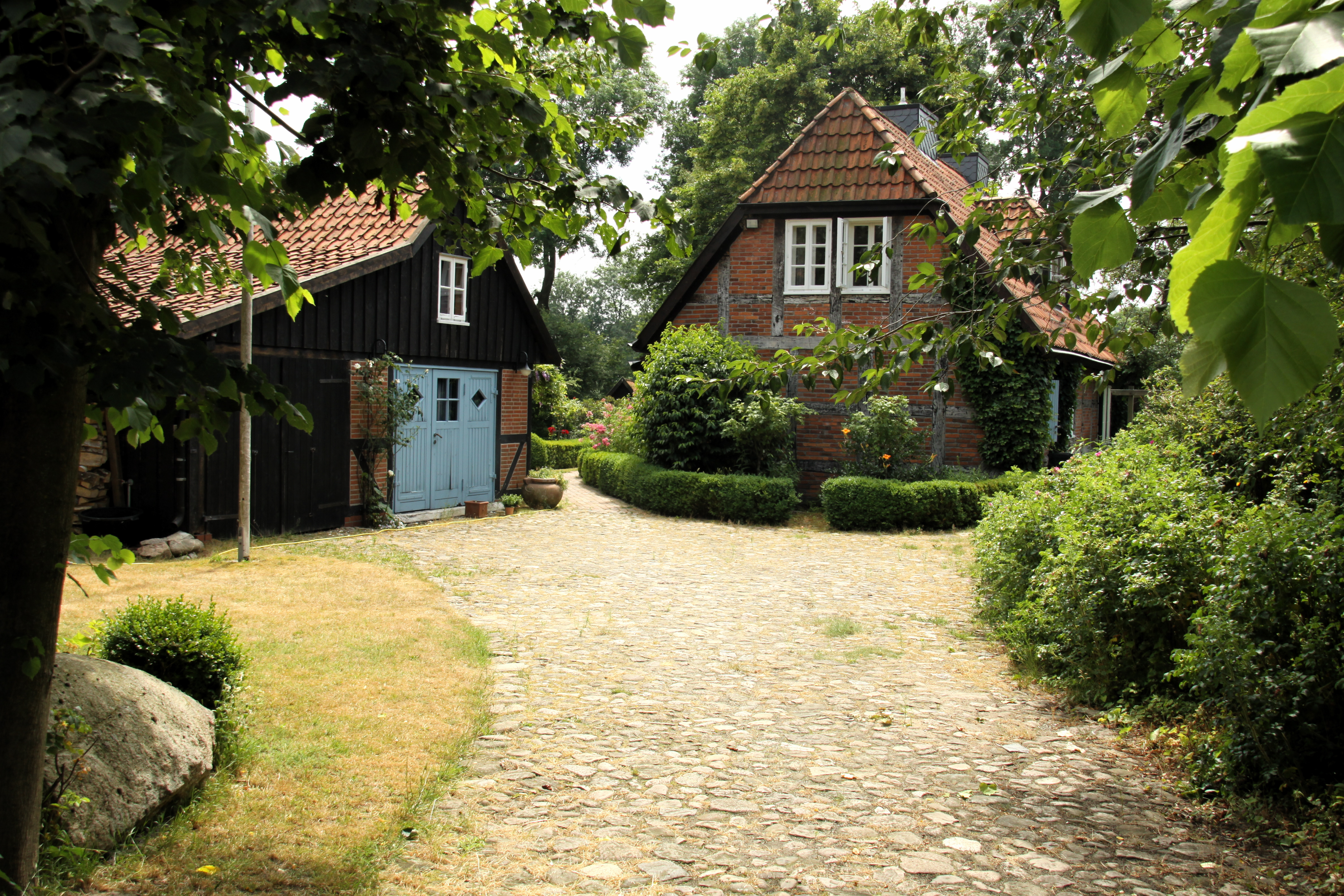
Fischerhude

Fischerhude is a village located next to the Wümme river in northern Germany between Bremen and Hamburg. Fischerhude is part of the municipality of Ottersberg, in the district of Verden.

It is well known as an art colony where artists like Otto Modersohn and Clara Westhoff used to work and live.
