= Weißensee Academy of Art Berlin =

Art school in Berlin, Germany

Weißensee Academy of Art Berlin, also known as Berlin-Weissensee Art Academy, School of Art and Design Berlin-Weissensee (German: Kunsthochschule Berlin-Weißensee), is a non-profit, public art school in Berlin-Weißensee, Berlin, Germany, founded in 1946. In the winter semester 2023/24, around 820 students were enrolled.

The academy is equipped with 19 workshops and studios, offering practical training in areas such as printing, casting, weaving, knitting, and digital technologies. Research laboratories focus on experimental research and sustainable design strategies, integrating media and information technologies.

== History ==
The Weißensee Academy of Art Berlin was founded in 1946 during Germany's post-war reconstruction by artists associated with the Bauhaus movement. Initially known as the "Art School of the North", it was temporarily housed in a former chocolate factory. Prominent early rectors included Dutch designer and architect Mart Stam and ceramicist Jan Bontjes van Beek. In the 1950s, under the direction of Bauhaus architect Selman Selmanagić, the academy expanded and became the East Berlin Academy of Art. Following German reunification, parts of the campus were modernized, with new buildings added in 2011 and the restoration of the 1956 auditorium completed in 2012.

== Locations ==
The Weißensee Academy of Art Berlin operates across several locations, each dedicated to specific aspects of its educational and research activities:

- Main Campus (Hauptstandort Kunsthochschule Berlin): Located at Bühringstraße 20, 13086 Berlin, this is the primary site for most academic departments and administrative offices.
- Kunsthalle am Hamburger Platz: Serving as the academy's exhibition hall, it provides space for students and faculty to showcase their work to the public.
- Bronzegießerei Johannisthal: This bronze foundry is utilized for sculpture and casting projects, offering specialized facilities for students working with metal.
- Art Therapy Center (Standort Kunsttherapie): Dedicated to the academy's Art Therapy program, this location provides tailored spaces for both instruction and practice.
- Sauen Meeting Place (Begegnungsstätte Sauen): Situated outside Berlin, this retreat center is used for workshops, seminars, and collaborative projects, fostering creative exchange in a tranquil environment.

== Facilities ==
The Weißensee Academy of Art Berlin offers a range of specialized facilities to support its diverse art and design programs:

- Studios and Workshops
- Library
- Exhibition Spaces
- Auditorium
- Cafeteria (Mensa): Located on campus.

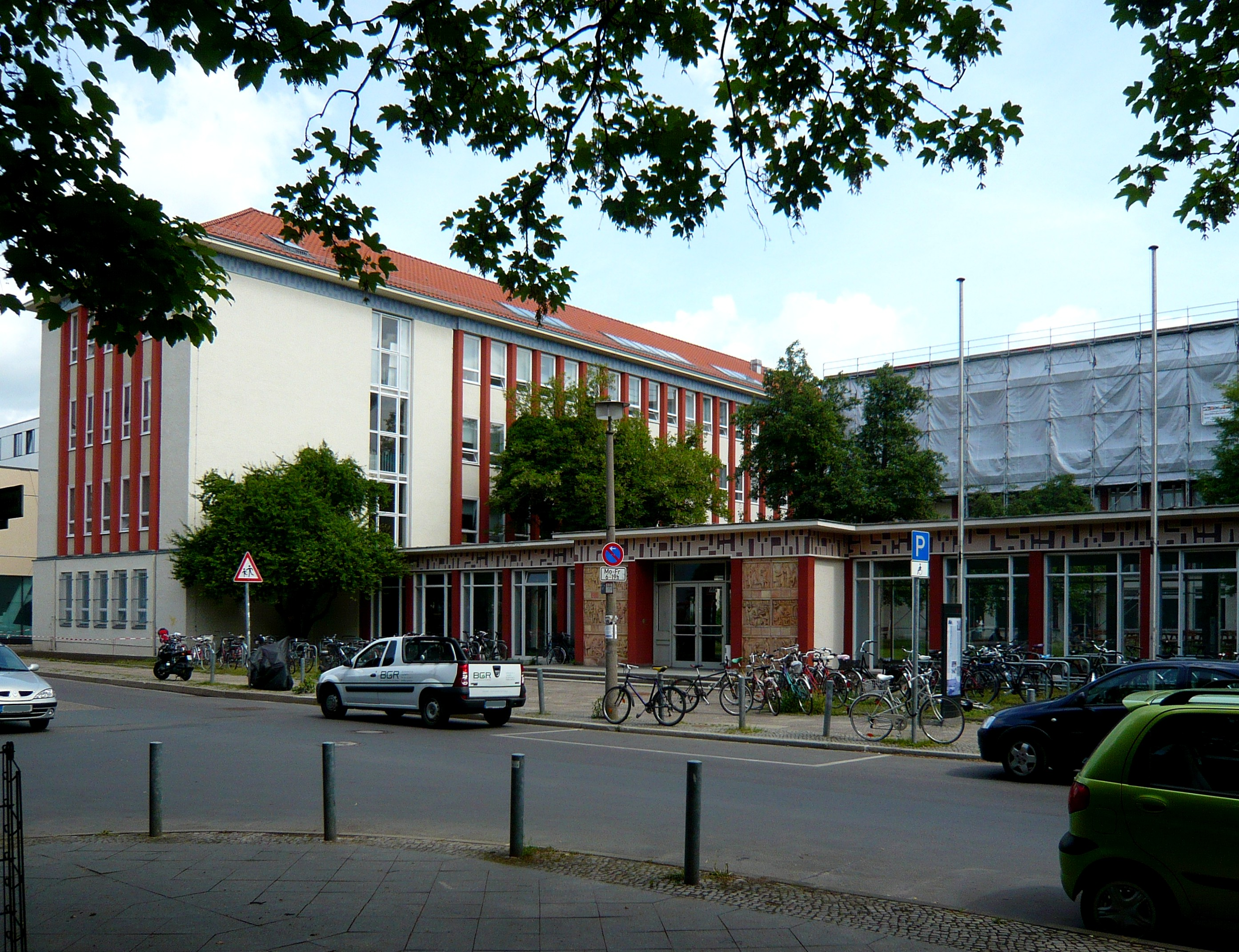
Bühringstr Weißensee 110523 AMA fec (70)

== Research ==
A significant aspect of the academy's research endeavors is its involvement in the excellence cluster "Matters of Activity. Image Space Material", coordinated by Humboldt University in Berlin. Within this cluster, scientists and designers from over 40 disciplines collaborate to develop sustainable processes and structures across various fields, including materials technology, medical technology, architecture, and robotics.

Additionally, the academy leads the BMBF-funded project "Textile Prototyping Lab", collaborating with renowned research institutes and industry stakeholders.
