= Paula Modersohn-Becker =

German expressionist painter and draftswoman (1876–1907)

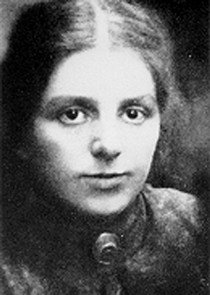
- Paula Modersohn-Becker, year unknown
- Born: Minna Hermine Paula Becker; 8 February 1876; Friedrichstadt, German Empire
- Died: 20 November 1907 (aged 31); Worpswede, German Empire
- Occupations: Artist, painter
- Years active: 1895–1907
- Known for: Expressionism
- Notable work: Reclining Mother and Child Nude (1906); Self-Portrait at 6th Wedding Anniversary (1906)
- Spouse: Otto Modersohn (m. 1901)
- Children: Mathilde Modersohn

Paula Modersohn-Becker (8 February 1876 – 20 November 1907) was a German Expressionist painter and draftswoman of the late 19th and early 20th centuries. She is noted for the many self-portraits, including nudes. She is considered one of the most important representatives of early expressionism, producing more than 700 paintings and over 1000 drawings during her active painting life. She is recognized both as the first known woman painter to paint nude self-portraits, and the first woman to have a museum devoted exclusively to her art (the Paula Modersohn-Becker Museum, founded 1927). Additionally, she is believed to be the first woman artist to depict herself pregnant.

Her career was cut short when she died from postpartum pulmonary embolism at the age of 31.

== Biography ==
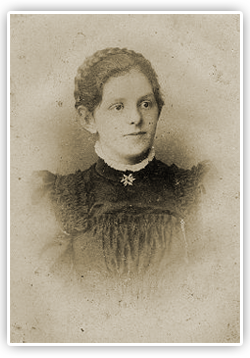
Paula Becker (1892) Collection of Haus Paula Becker, Bremen

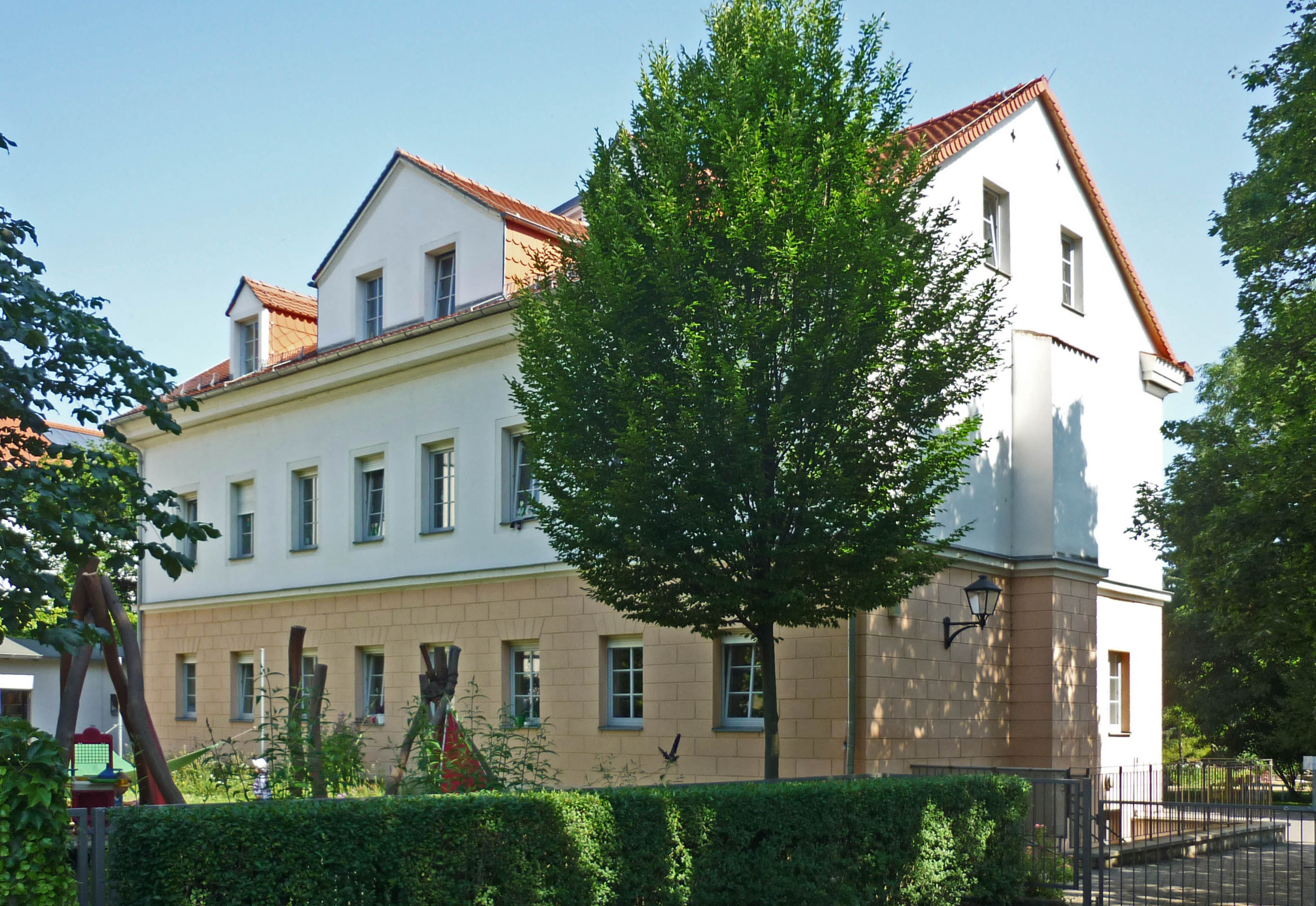
Dresden-Friedrichstadt: After Paula's birth, the Becker family moved into a house in "Friedrichstraße 29" (today "Friedrichstraße 46").

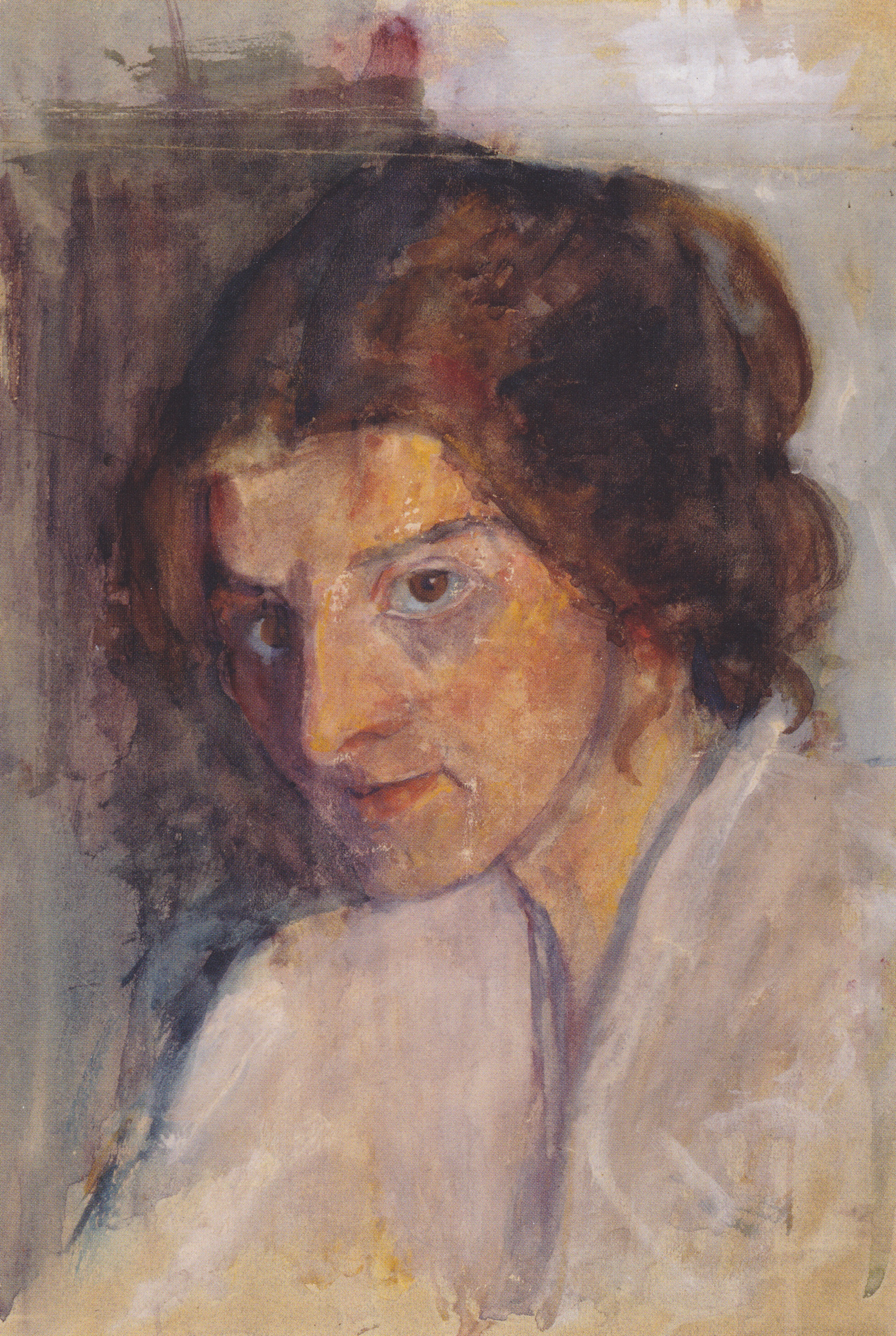
Paula Modersohn-Becker, Self-portrait (1897) gouache, PM-B Museum

=== Early life ===
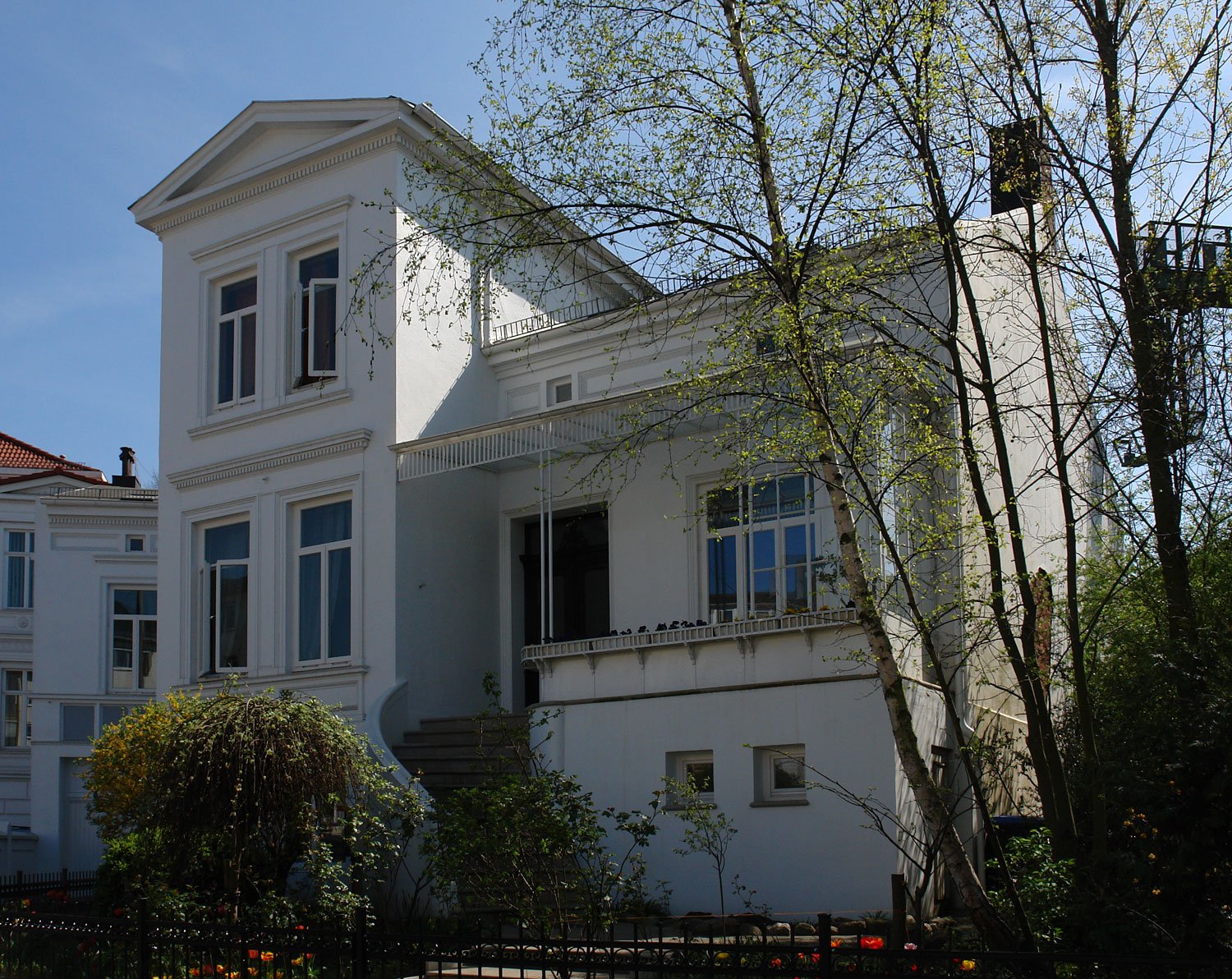
Schwachhauser Heerstr. 23, Bremen. Becker family home and residence of Paula Becker (1888–1899)

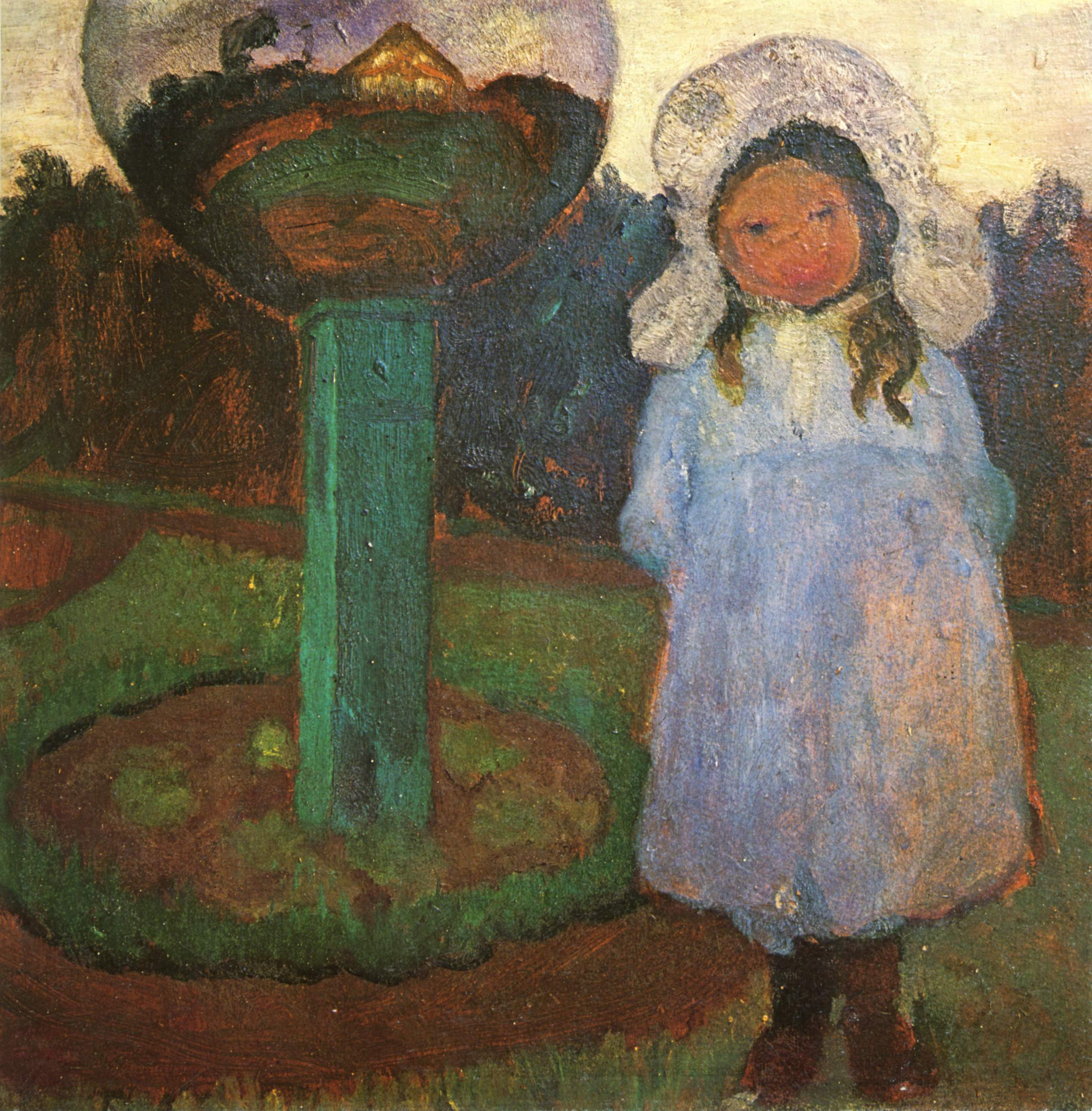
Paula Modersohn-Becker, Girl in a Garden Next to a Glass Sphere (1901–02)

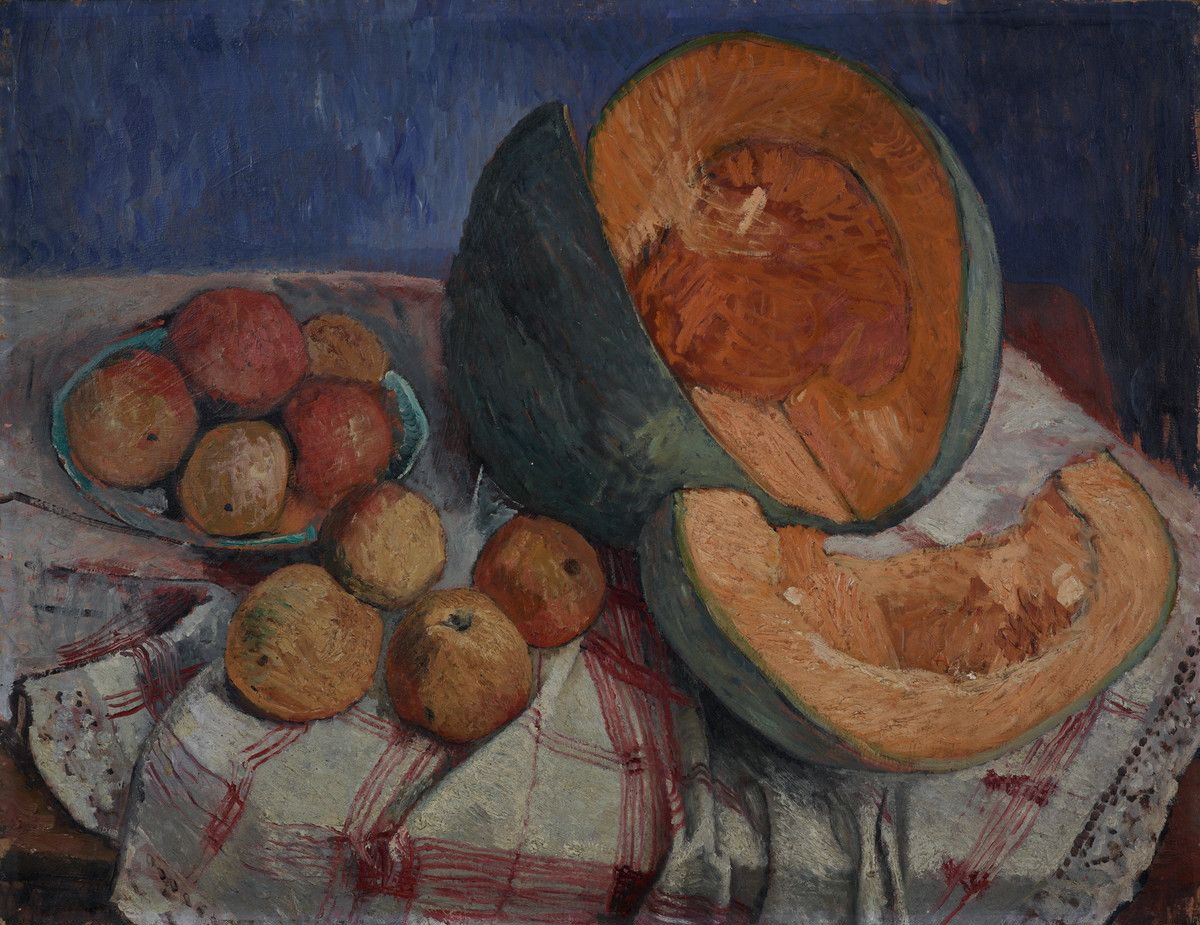
Paula Modersohn-Becker, Still life with Melon (1905) Museum Ludwig, Cologne, Germany

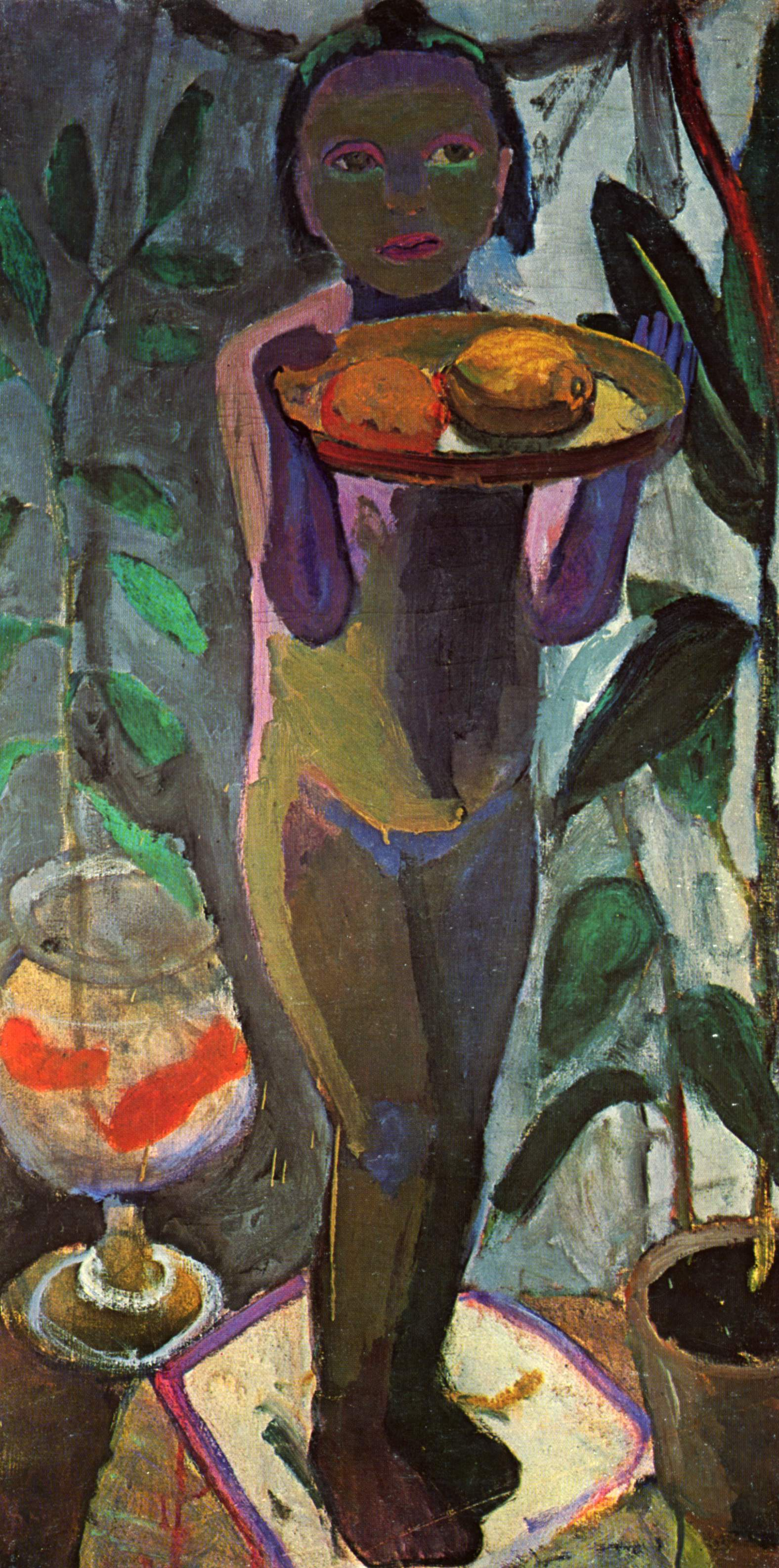
Paula Modersohn-Becker, Child with Goldfish (1907)

Becker was born and grew up in Dresden, in the Friedrichstadt area. She was the third of seven children in her family. Her father, Carl Woldemar Becker (1841–1901), the Odessa-born son of a Russian university professor of French, was employed as an engineer with the German railway. Her mother, Mathilde (1852–1926), was from the aristocratic von Bültzingslöwen family, and her parents provided their children a cultured and intellectual household environment.

Despite these advantages of family, the Beckers found themselves in socially constrained circumstances. In 1861, Oskar Becker, Carl's brother, in an unsuccessful assassination attempt, had shot King Wilhelm of Prussia in the neck. The King was not severely injured, and Oskar was pardoned five years later for the crime (on condition that he permanently leave the country), but the constraints of opportunity for Carl Becker's family would linger.

In 1888 the family moved from Dresden to Bremen, where Carl Becker had obtained a position on the building board of the Prussian Railway Administration. The family interacted with Bremen's local artistic and intellectual circles, and Paula began to learn to draw. In the summer of 1892, her parents sent her to relatives in England to learn English. While living with a maternal aunt in London, Becker received her first instruction in drawing at St John's Wood Art School.

After returning to Bremen, she studied at a teachers' training school from 1893 to 1895, as her father wished (two sisters also attended this program). Concurrently she received private painting lessons from local German painter Bernhard Wiegandt.

She worked as a painter from around 1893, at age 16, and was allowed to set up her first studio in the extension of her parents' house in Bremen (later Haus Paula Becker, with Becker's early studio intact). From this period comes a series of portraits of her siblings and also the first self-portrait (1893). She completed her teacher's course "with flying colors", but it was clear that she had little intention of pursuing a career in that profession.

In the spring of 1896, Paula was able to travel to Berlin to take part in a six-week drawing and painting course organized by the Berlin Artists' Association (Verein der Berliner Künstlerinnen), staying with members of her mother's family while completing her course. After graduating, she stayed on in Berlin, and in February 1897 was admitted to the first class of painting at the Women's Academy. Paula additionally used her Berlin time to visit its art museums, studying the works of German and Italian artists. An encounter with an important proponent for German feminism, Natalie von Milde, made a deep impression, although swift intervention from her family cut that connection short.

After these years of study, Becker returned to Bremen. She convinced her family to allow her to attend a further course at the nearby artists' colony in the northern German town of Worpswede.

=== Worpswede ===
Becker had become familiar with the Worpswede colony as early as 1895, when Fritz Mackensen, Otto Modersohn, Fritz Overbeck and Heinrich Vogeler presented their paintings in Bremen's art museum, the Kunsthalle Bremen. The colony had begun when Mackensen and Heinrich Vogeler had retreated to the countryside, partly as a protest against the domination of the art-academy style and life in the big city, and also to save on expenses.

Becker joined the colony in 1898, initially as a student of Mackensen. At this time she began close friendships with the sculptor Clara Westhoff (1875–1954), the painter Ottilie Reylaender (1882–1965), and the poet Rainer Maria Rilke (1875–1926). It became quickly evident, however, that Worpswede was not suited to Becker's rapidly developing artistic style. In her journal, Becker wrote: "the way Mackensen portrays people is not broad enough, too genre-like for me."

Two paintings she exhibited at the Bremen Kunsthalle in December 1899 were sharply criticized and had to be removed during the exhibition, having been subject to a "hysterical" attack by the art critic Arthur Fitger. He was later regarded as having been more outraged by the inclusion of female artists in the show than in anything particular portrayed by the actual artworks. While the community at Worpswede remained rooted in romanticized traditions of landscape, her own artistic interests were shifting noticeably toward Paris and leaving her feeling increasingly alienated.

=== Paris ===
Paris at the turn of the 20th century was the acknowledged epicenter of artistic exploration, and many artists of the time felt its pull. Westhoff, Becker's close friend, left Bremen in early 1899 to study in Paris with Auguste Rodin. Rilke also went with her, serving for a time as Rodin's secretary. By December of that year, Becker, having come into a small inheritance, followed her friend there, and in 1900 she began to study anatomy at the Académie Colarossi in the Latin Quarter. She also visited museums or exhibitions and galleries alone or with Westhoff to get to know modern French painters. She was particularly impressed by the paintings of Paul Cézanne, and Les Nabis, who emphasized the importance of colored areas in paintings following the example of Paul Gauguin. "In her painting, she followed the inspiration of the contemporary artists she had encountered in Paris, moving increasingly far from the conventional painting her colleagues at Worpswede were producing." These artists inspired her to use simplified forms and symbolic, rather than naturalistic colour.

In April 1900, the great World's Fair Centennial Exhibition opened in Paris. Otto Modersohn, a Worpswede painter who had been an on-and-off resident of the colony since 1897, arrived in town with mutual friends to attend. His sick wife Helene had remained behind in Worpswede, and she died during Modersohn's short time in Paris. Modersohn hurried back to Germany. Shortly thereafter, Becker returned to Worpswede herself. It was clear to Becker's parents that the two had become romantically involved, but their disapproval was of little impact.

=== Marriage with Otto Modersohn ===
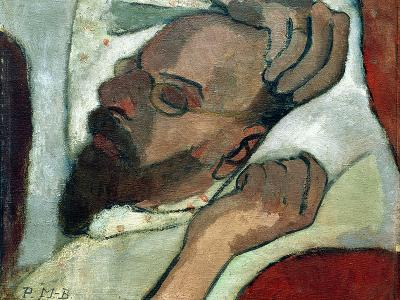
Paula Modersohn-Becker, Otto Modersohn Sleeping (1906)

In May 1901, Becker and Modersohn married. Modersohn was 11 years older than Becker, with an infant daughter, Elsbeth. In the two years that followed, Becker tried to combine her responsibilities as wife, housewife and stepmother with her artistic ambitions. She set up a small studio on a nearby farm, where she went to paint for several hours a day. A series of paintings of children was created, among them Girl in the Garden Next to a Glass Sphere (1901–02), Portrait of a Girl (1901), Head of a Little Girl (1902). She functioned in this uneasy balance for two years, then returned again to Paris, accompanied by Otto, for two months in 1903. She spent most of her time drawing in the Louvre from ancient and Egyptian models. With Otto, she visited Auguste Rodin, also taking time to study the newly popular Japanese style and visit with painters Pierre Bonnard and Edouard Vuillard. In February 1905 Becker again returned to Paris. Otto briefly came to see her, and together they saw Paul Gauguin's paintings. After this visit, Becker "accepted the fact that modern artists such as Matisse, whose works fascinated her, had no appeal for Otto." She took drawing courses at the Julian Academy, but became increasingly aware that she had already developed her own painting style. After returning to Worpswede, her interest focused on still life. While before 1905 only ten still lifes can be traced in her work, from 1905 to 1907 there are almost 50. She and Modersohn lived mostly apart for the next two years, with 1906 marking an artistically productive year, spent mostly in Paris. During her stays in Paris in 1905 and 1906, she lived in her studio on Avenue du Maine, where she created, among other things, portraits of Clara (Rilke-)Westhoff and Clara's husband Rainer Maria Rilke.

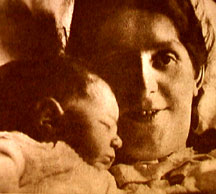
Paula with Mathilde (November 1907, days before Paula's death)

==== 1906: "I am becoming somebody" ====
In a letter to Rilke written from Worpswede on 17 February 1906, Becker wrote: "And now, I don't even know how I should sign my name, I'm not Modersohn and I'm not Paula Becker anymore either." Less than a month later she wrote from Paris to her husband, "try to get used to the possibility of the thought that our lives can go separate ways". In 1906, Modersohn-Becker left Worpswede, as well as her husband, Otto, to pursue an artistic career in Paris. In a journal entry dated 24 February 1906, a sanguine Modersohn-Becker wrote, "Now I have left Otto Modersohn and am standing between my old life and my new life. I wonder what the new one will be like. And I wonder what will become of me in my new life? Now whatever must be, will be." Despite her sister's and mother's general disapproval of Paula's decision to leave Otto for Paris, her relocation there proved to be quite prosperous.

It was during this period that she accomplished her most intensive, and later most highly regarded, work. From this body of work she produced a series of paintings about which she felt great excitement and satisfaction. During this period of painting, she produced her initial nude self-portraits (including Self-Portrait at 6th Wedding Anniversary), works that were unprecedented for female artists, as well as portraits of friends. During her final trip to Paris in May 1906, she wrote a letter to her elder sister, Milly Rohland-Becker, in which she stated, "I am becoming somebody – I'm living the most intensively happy period of my life."

=== Final year and death ===
In 1907, Becker returned to her husband in Worpswede, despite periodic correspondence that indicated her desire for independence. She had written in detail about her love for her husband but also of her need to delay motherhood in her pursuit of artistic freedom. She continued to express ambivalence regarding motherhood as she was concerned about her ability to paint while raising a child; her diary entries indicate that she had planned on achieving a painting career by age thirty, then having children. When her daughter Mathilde (Tillie) Modersohn was born on 2 November 1907, Paula and Otto were joyous. The historian Katja Haustein argues that Becker's works depicting motherhood were inspired by contemporary ideas of "natural motherhood", against increased German state intervention into the private lives of women and the maternal relationship with their children.

She had complained of pain in her legs after the delivery, and was advised to remain in bed. When the physician returned on 20 November, he advised her to rise. She walked a few steps, then sat down, called for the infant to be placed in her arms, complained of leg pain, and died, saying only "What a pity".

Paula's death was likely due to deep venous thrombosis (DVT), a complication of pregnancy that is relatively common when women are set to bed for a long time after delivery, as was customary practice at that time. Apparently, a thrombus had formed in her leg, and with her mobility, broke off and then caused her death within hours.

She was buried in the Worpswede Cemetery.

== Self-portraits ==
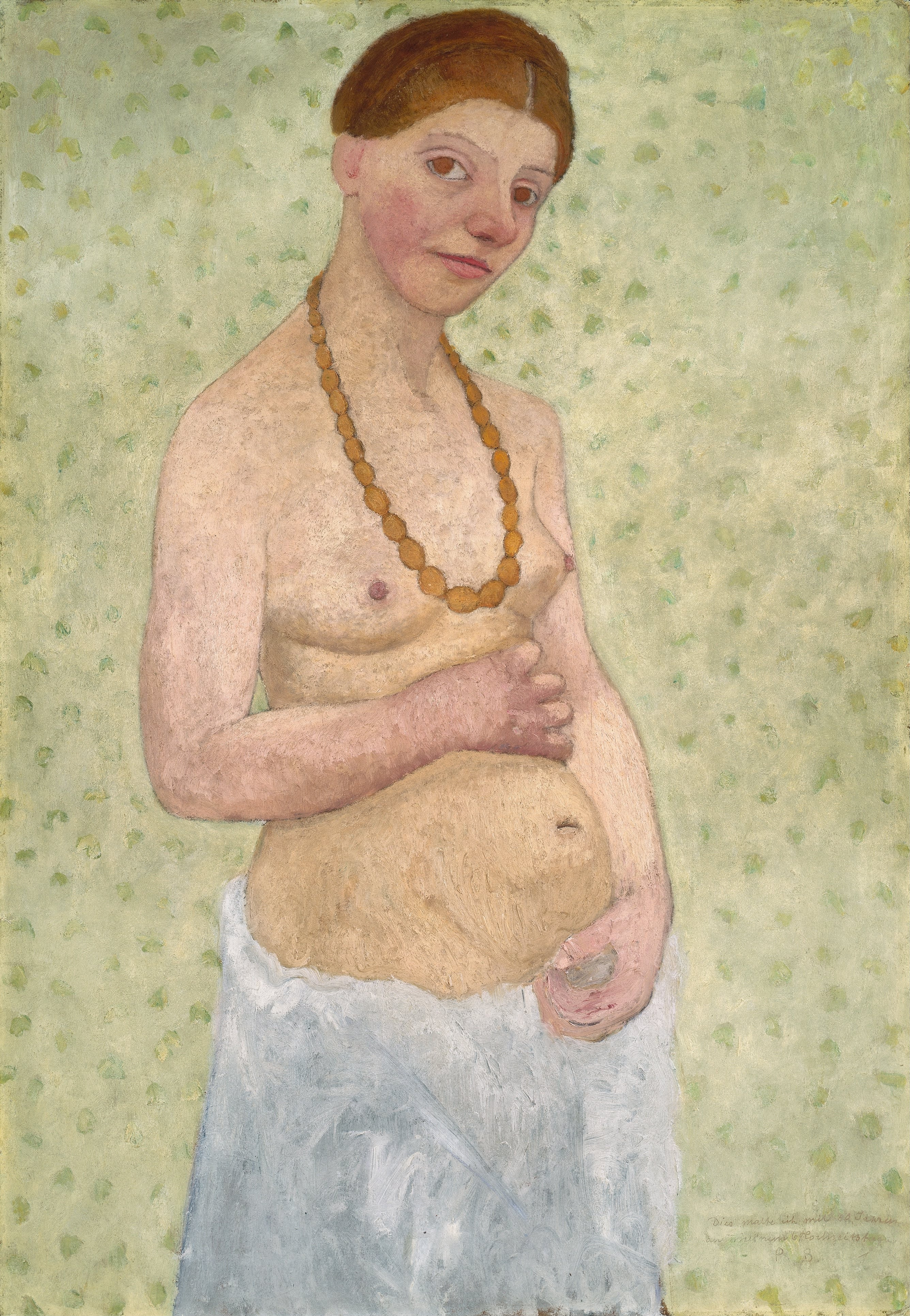
Paula Modersohn-Becker. Self-Portrait at 6th Wedding Anniversary (1906)

Until the years when Becker began the practice, women painters had not widely used nude females as subjects for their work.

Notable exceptions are the works by Artemisia Gentileschi, three centuries earlier; however, art historians have asserted that Gentileschi made use of her own body as a reference for her work out of necessity and lack of access to any other models (in, for example, Gentileschi's 1610 Susanna and the Elders), as opposed to creating an intentional, purposeful, self-portrait (an assertion that continues to be debated).

These arguments aside, Becker is generally accepted as the first known woman painter to paint nude self-portraits, and the first woman painter known to have painted herself pregnant and pregnant and nude.

Becker's work on the female nude is unconventional and expresses an ambivalence to both her subject matter and the method of its representation.

== Painting technique ==
Becker was trained in the methods of realism and naturalism, along with a recognizable simplicity of form.

She was able to achieve a distinct texture to her work by scratching into the wet paint. Modersohn-Becker employed the same technique throughout her short career as a painter. She worked in tempera and oil with a limited palette range of pigments such as zinc white, cadmium yellow, viridian, and synthetic ultramarine. She later abandoned those techniques to move into Fauvism. Fauvist influences appear in her works such as Poorhouse Woman with a Glass Bottle.

=== Influences ===
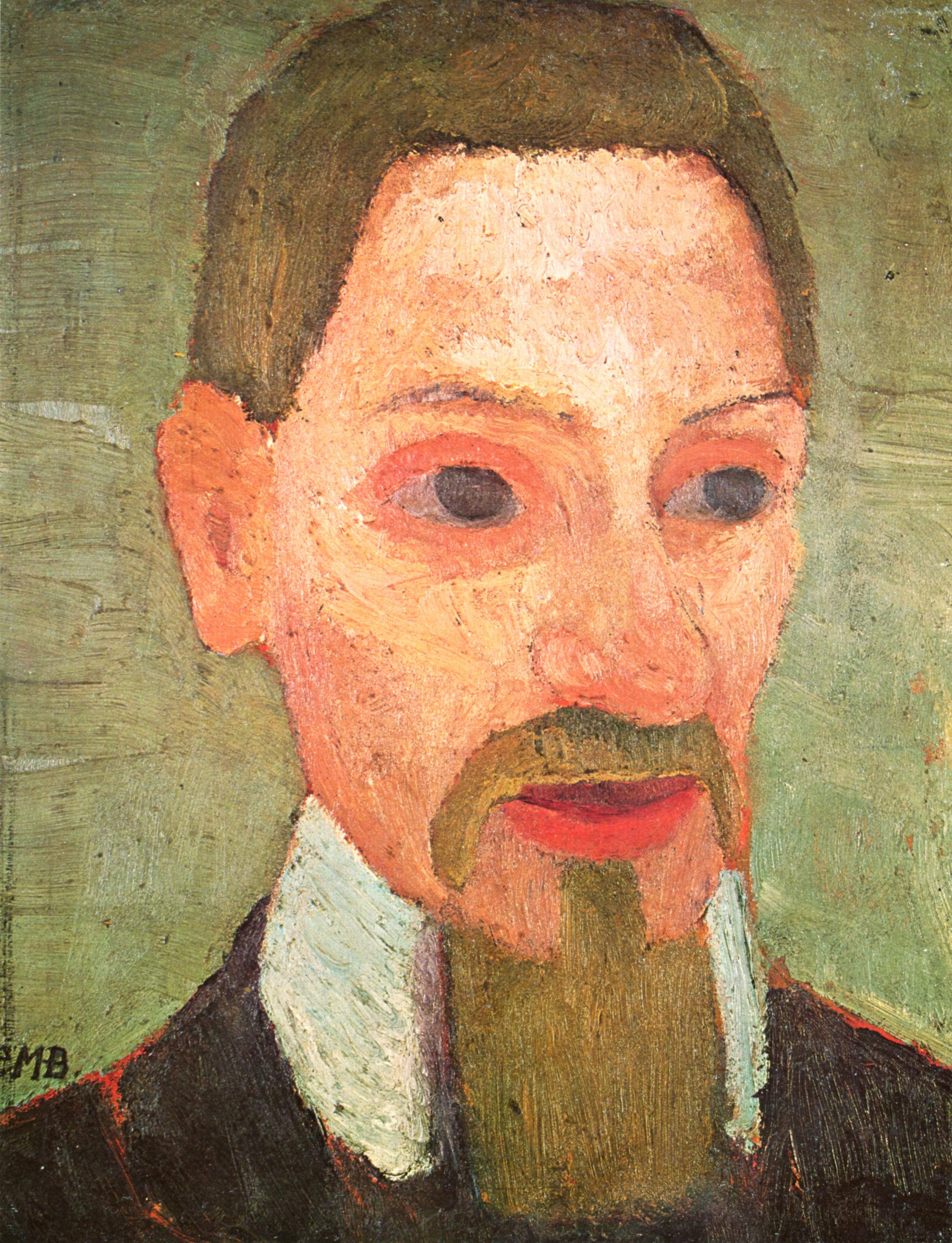
Paula Modersohn-Becker, Portrait of Rainer Maria Rilke (1906)

There is evidence to suggest that a number of Paula Modersohn-Becker's self-portraits were influenced by the Pre-Raphaelite painter Dante Rossetti, including Self-portrait with a bowl and a glass (c. 1904; Sander Collection), Self-portrait nude with amber necklace (1906; Private collection), and Self-Portrait on 6th Wedding Anniversary (1906; Museen Böttcherstrasse, Paula Modersohn- Becker Museum, Bremen). She visited contemporary exhibitions often, and was particularly intrigued with the work of Paul Cézanne. Other post-impressionists were especially influential, including Vincent van Gogh and Paul Gauguin.

=== Influence ===
Becker may have influenced some of Picasso's paintings, as Diane Radycki posits in her 2013 monograph on the artist.

== Legacy ==
By 1899 Clara Westhoff had made a bust of Modersohn-Becker, saying that it was a symbol of their friendship and shared passion for art. In 1908, on the first anniversary of her death, Rainer Maria Rilke wrote the renowned poem "Requiem for a Friend" in Modersohn-Becker's memory.

Becker was not widely known at her untimely death, and had sold few paintings during her lifetime. It was only thanks to exhibitions organized in the first years after her death that some collectors learned about her and began to acquire her paintings.

=== Correspondence and journals ===
On the tenth anniversary of her death, in 1917, the Kestnergesellschaft in Hanover organized a large exhibition of Becker's works and published a selection of her letters and diaries, which told her life, feelings and friendships, as well as the thoughts that shaped her art. Becker had maintained a voluminous correspondence with friends in her artistic circle, as well as a diary. Two-thirds of the correspondence occurred from age 16 to the early years of her marriage, and it is full of youthful optimism and energy. As with the Journal of Marie Bashkirtseff, published a generation before (and an important influence on Becker herself), this Collection proved highly popular, and was published abroad several times after World War. It was in a good part through her writings that her reputation was first maintained.

=== First woman to have a museum devoted exclusively to her art ===
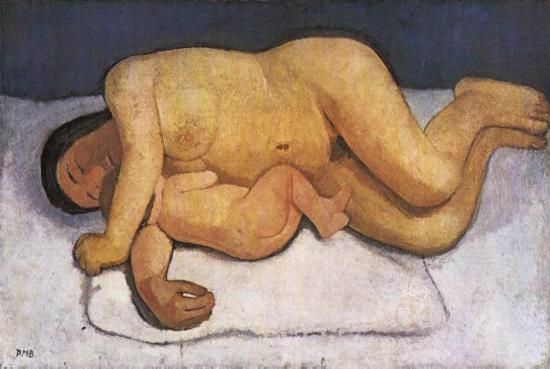
Paula Modersohn-Becker, Reclining Mother and Child (1906)

In 1927 businessman Ludwig Roselius opened the Paula Modersohn-Becker Museum in Bremen. It was designed by Bernhard Hoetger, who had known Becker from Worpswede.

==== "Degenerate Art" ====
Local Nazis denounced the museum's art and architecture in 1935, but Roselius ignored this until Hitler denounced his entire Böttcherstraße in September 1936. After Roselius's secretary Barbara Goette intervened on his behalf with Hitler, the street's buildings were allowed to remain as a monument of "degenerate art".

But despite the survival of the architectural fabric of her museum, Becker's work did not escape the Nazis attention undamaged. In 1937, "70 of her paintings were purged from German museums, either destroyed or exhibited as 'degenerate art.'" The Nazi critique derided the lack of "femininity" in Becker's paintings: "A revolting mixture of colours, of idiotic figures, of sick children, degenerates, the dregs of humanity."

=== The Paula Modersohn-Becker Foundation ===
Mathilde Modersohn (1907–1998) founded the Paula Modersohn-Becker Foundation (Paula Modersohn-Becker-Stiftung) in 1978. To form the core of the foundation, Mathilde Modersohn donated more than 50 paintings and 500 drawings from her personal collection, which she had inherited through her mother's estate. The purpose of the foundation is to "enhance the knowledge of the artist by researching and cataloguing her complete works," and to protect the integrity of her corpus.

=== Paula Becker House ===
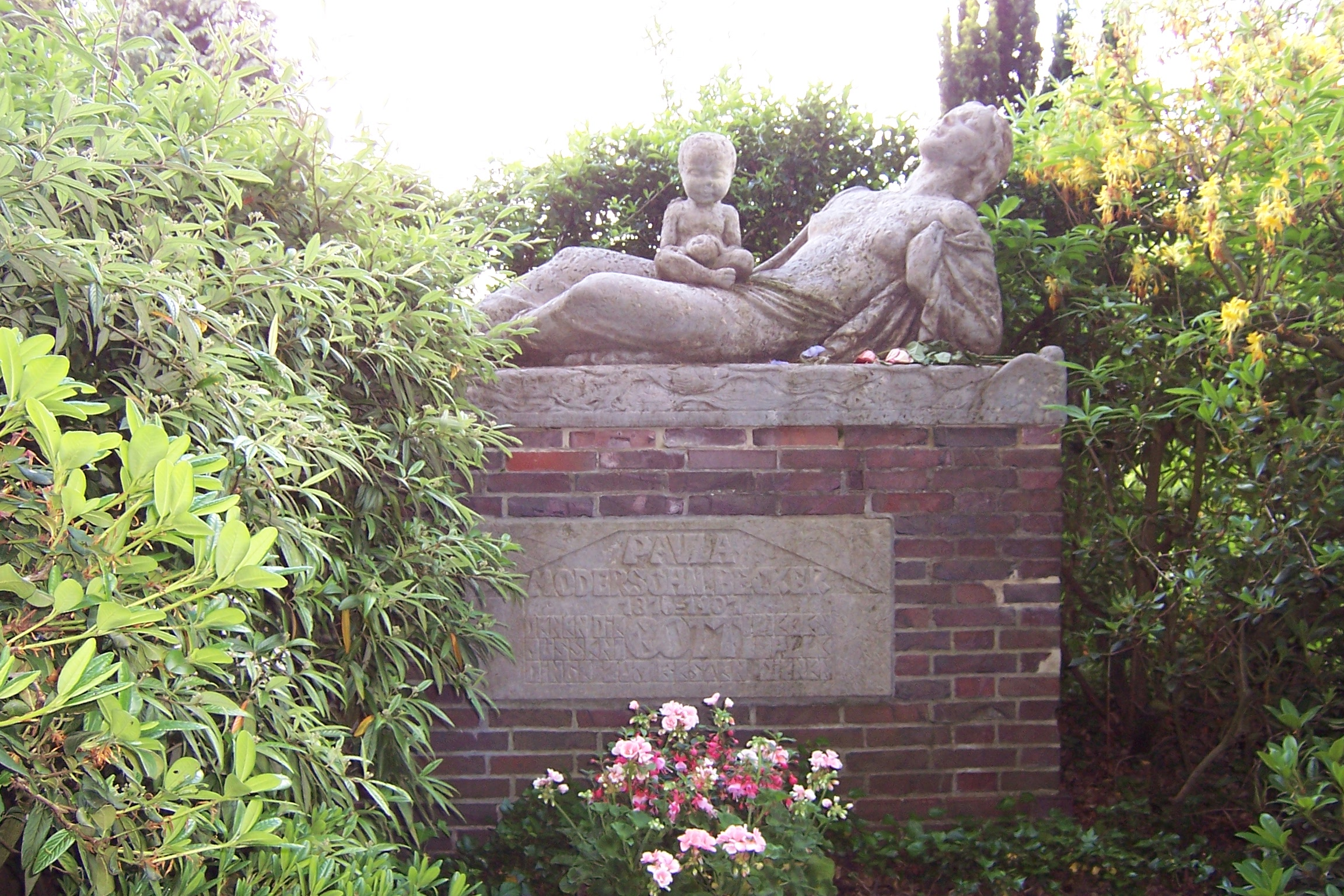
Monument on the grave of Paula Modersohn-Becker in Worpswede cemetery, by sculptor Bernhard Hoetger (1907)

Modersohn-Becker's house in Bremen, where she spent much of her life, opened in October 2007 as a private art museum and gallery. The Becker family had moved from Dresden to Bremen in 1888 and lived in this house. Becker lived in the house until 1899 when she was 23 years old and set up her first studio here. There was an active artist community in Bremen and via Becker's mother's friendships in the art world, Paula grew to be part of this community.

In 2003, Heinz and Betty Thies bought the then-rundown house and had it restored in time for the 100th anniversary of the artist's death. At that time (November 2007), it was turned into a public museum.

== Art market ==
The best selling painting by the artist in the art market was Self-Portrait Looking Slightly Left (1906), which sold in Berlin for €1,270,000 ($1,159,872) on 1 December 2025, well above the estimate of €250,000-350,000.

== In popular culture ==
- In 1988 a stamp with the portrait of Paula Modersohn-Becker was issued in the series Women in German history by the German post-office authority Deutsche Bundespost.
- On 8 February 2018, Becker's birthday was celebrated in a Google Doodle.
- The life of Paula Modersohn-Becker is fictionalized in Sue Hubbard's 2012 novel, Girl in White.
- She was the subject of a 2016 German bio-pic film, Paula.
- In 2025, ARTE produced a documentary about her.

== 21st century exhibitions ==
- Making Modernism: Paula Modersohn-Becker, Käthe Kollwitz, Gabriele Münter and Marianne Werefkin (12 November 2022 – 12 February 2023) Royal Academy of Arts, London
- These are my modern women: Trading Monet for Modersohn-Becker (20 February 2022 – 4 September 2022) Arp Museum Bahnhof Rolandseck
- Paula Modersohn-Becker (8 October 2021 – 6 February 2022) Schirn Kunsthalle, Frankfurt
- Paula Modersohn-Becker: An Intensely Artistic Eye (8 April 2016 – 21 August 2016) Musée d'Art moderne, Paris
- Paula Modersohn-Becker: Art and Life (February 2016 – 12 March 2016) Galerie St. Etienne, New York, New York
- Rebels and Martyrs: the image of the artist in the 19th century (opened 28 June 2006) National Gallery, London (first UK exhibition of Self-Portrait at 6th Wedding Anniversary)
- Paula Modersohn-Becker: Ich bin ich / I Am Me (6 June 2024 – 9 September 2024) Neue Galerie New York and (12 October 2024 – 12 January 2025) Art Institute of Chicago

== Gallery ==
=== Landscapes ===
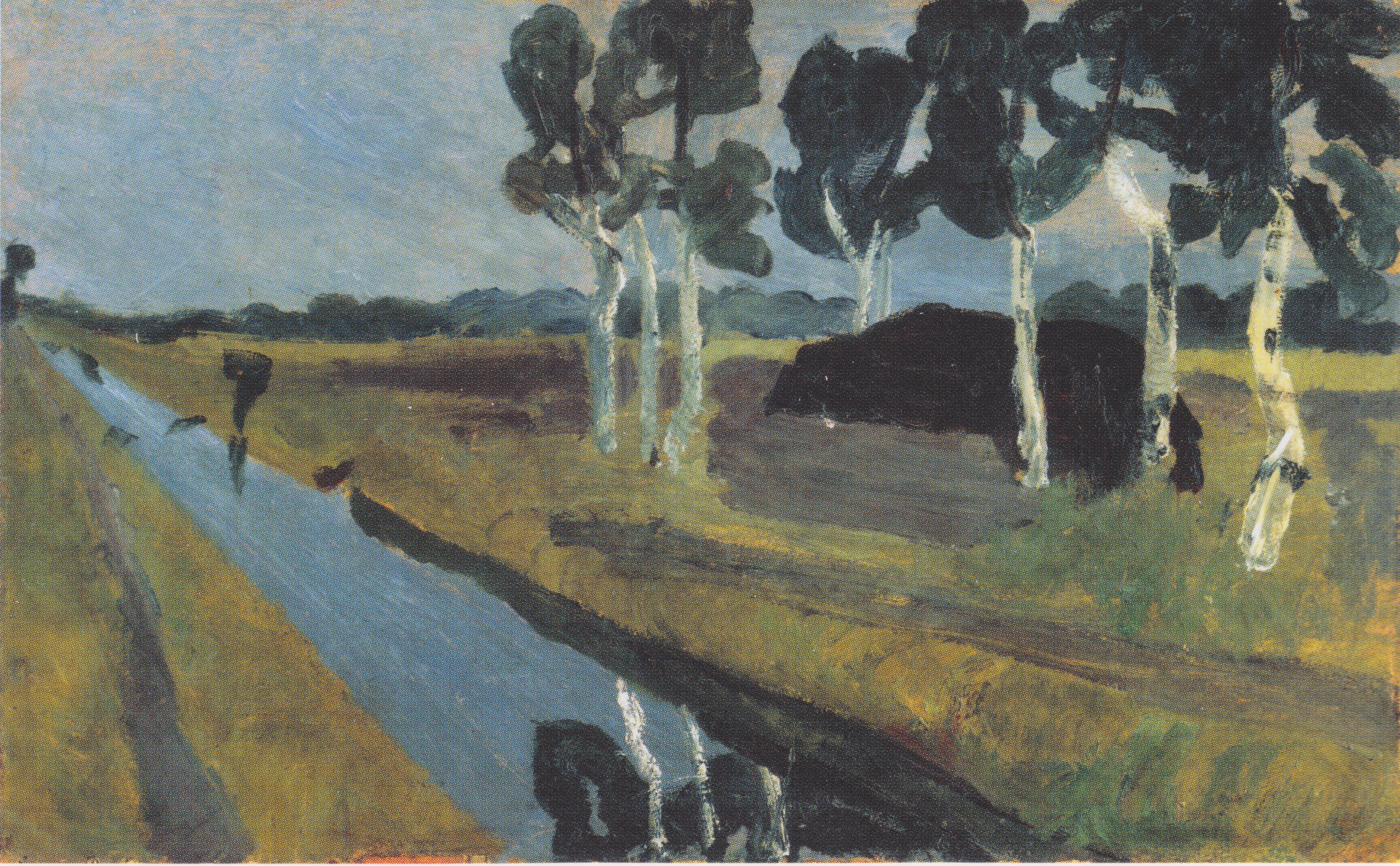
Gray Landscape with Moor Channel
(1899)

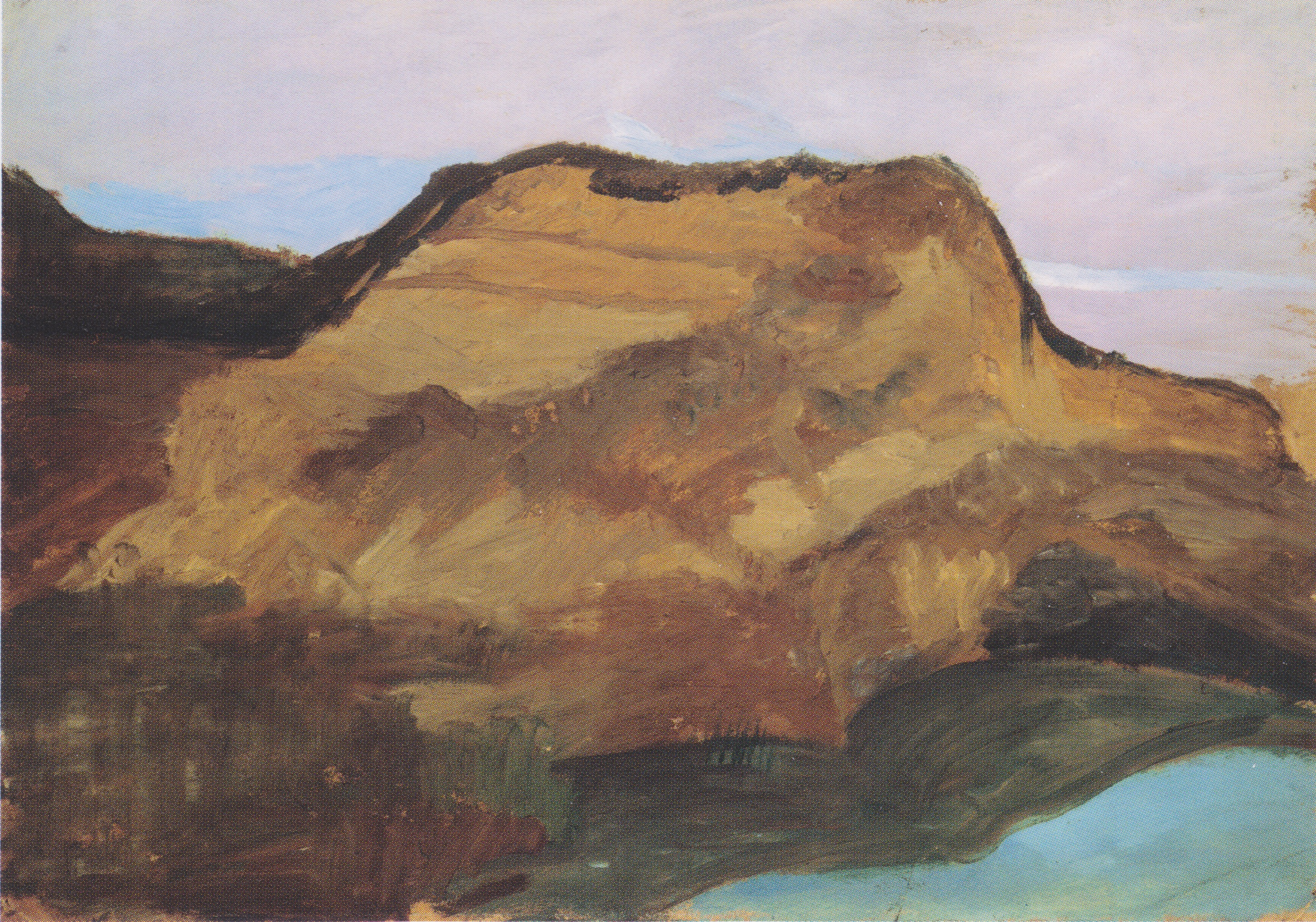
Sand Pit
(1901)

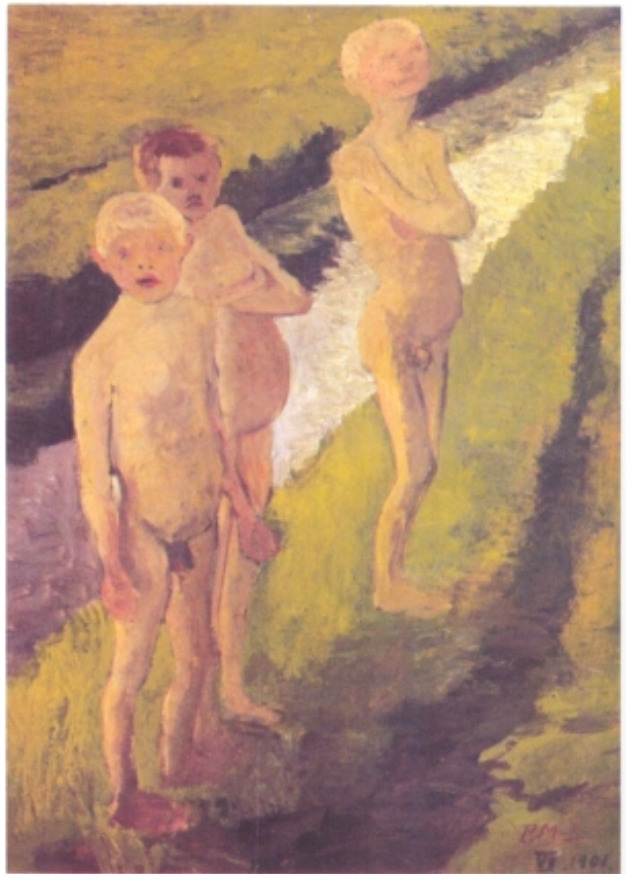
Three Boys Bathing in the canal
(1900)

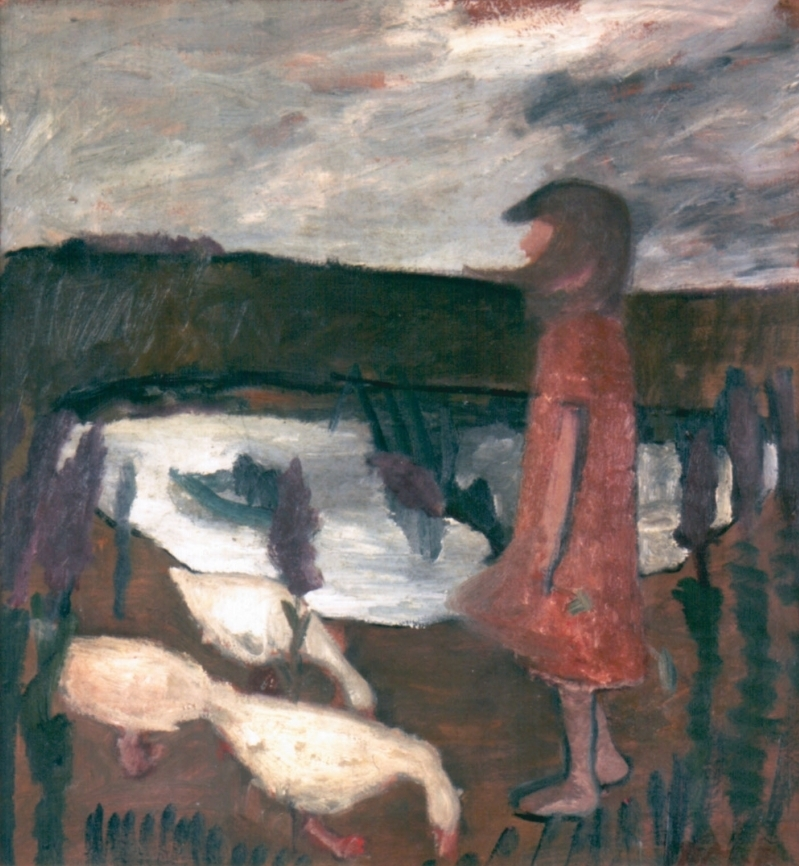
Girl with geese by a pond
(1901)

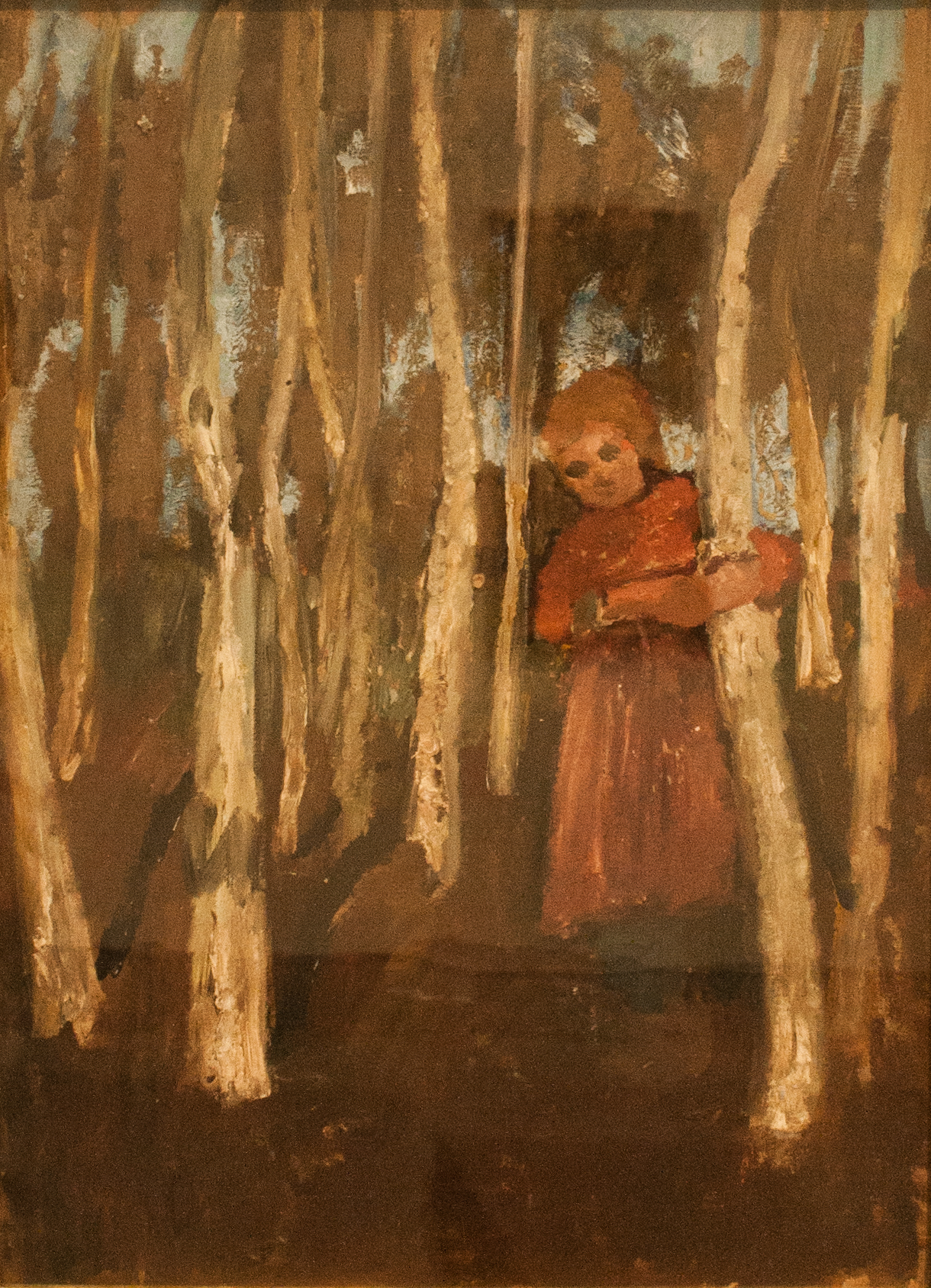
Girl in a Birch Forest (1903)
Royal Museum of Fine Arts, Ghent

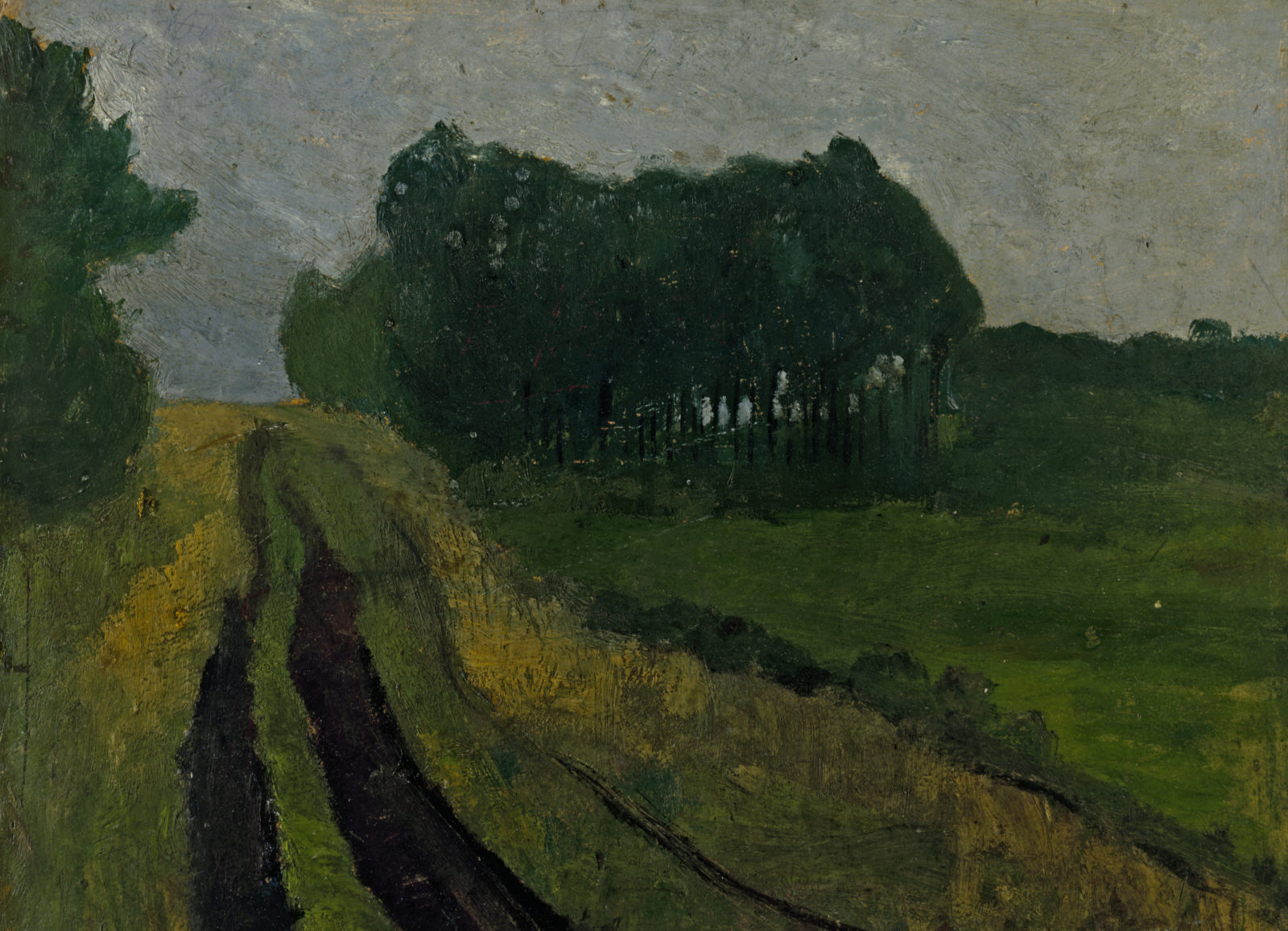
Evening Landscape
(1904)

=== Self-portraits ===
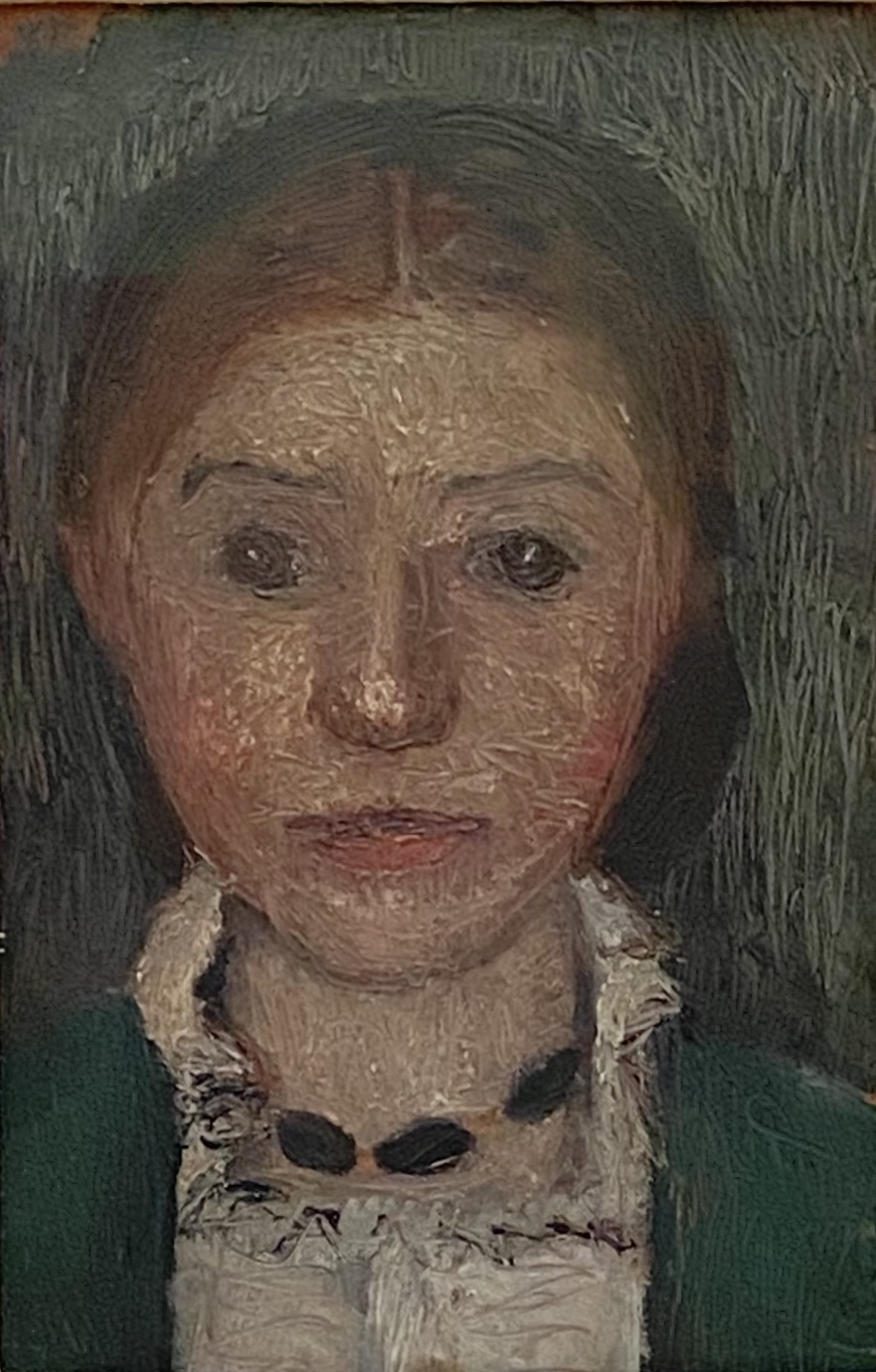
Self-portrait with chain
(1903)

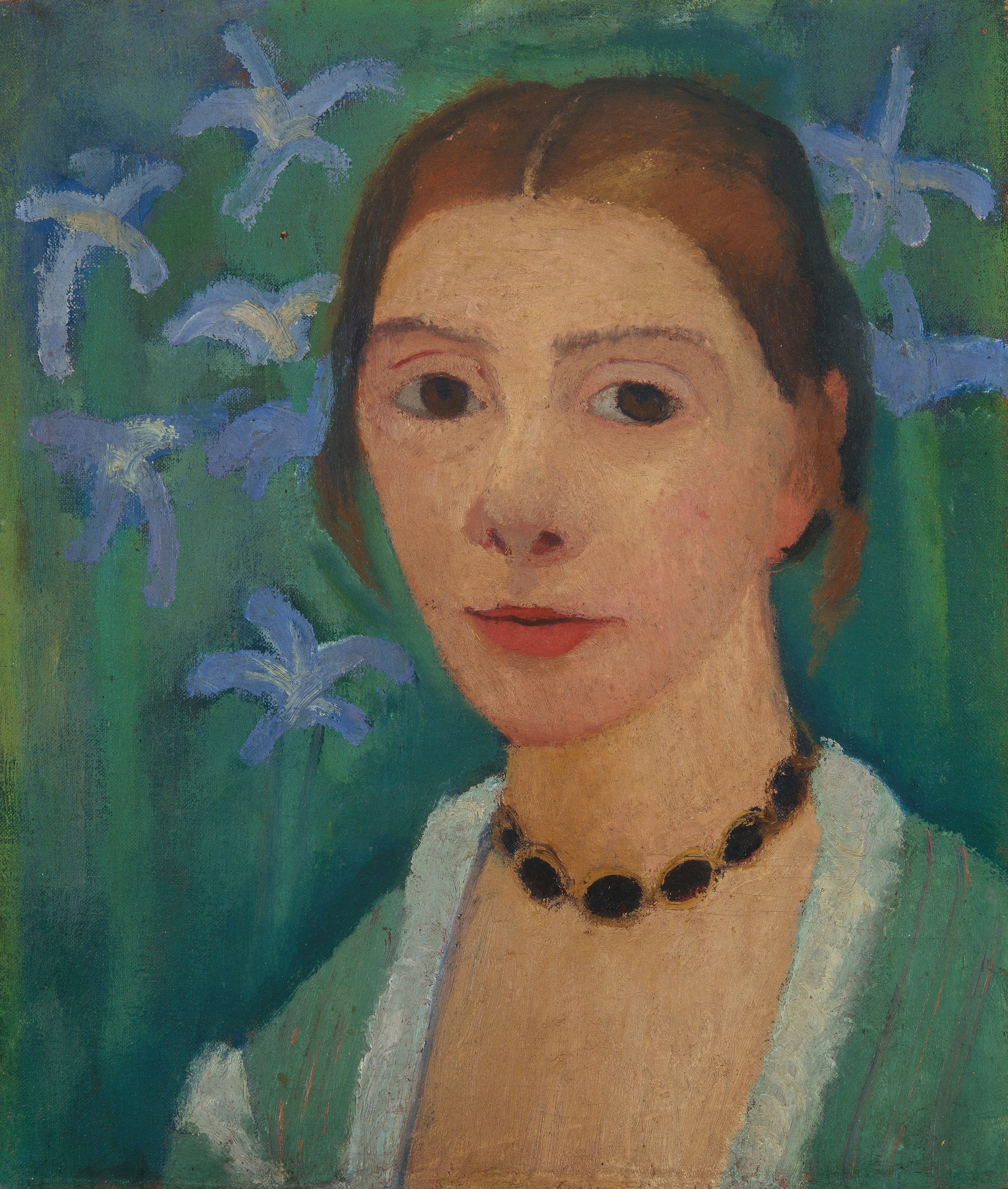
Self-portrait
with green background and blue irises (c. 1905)

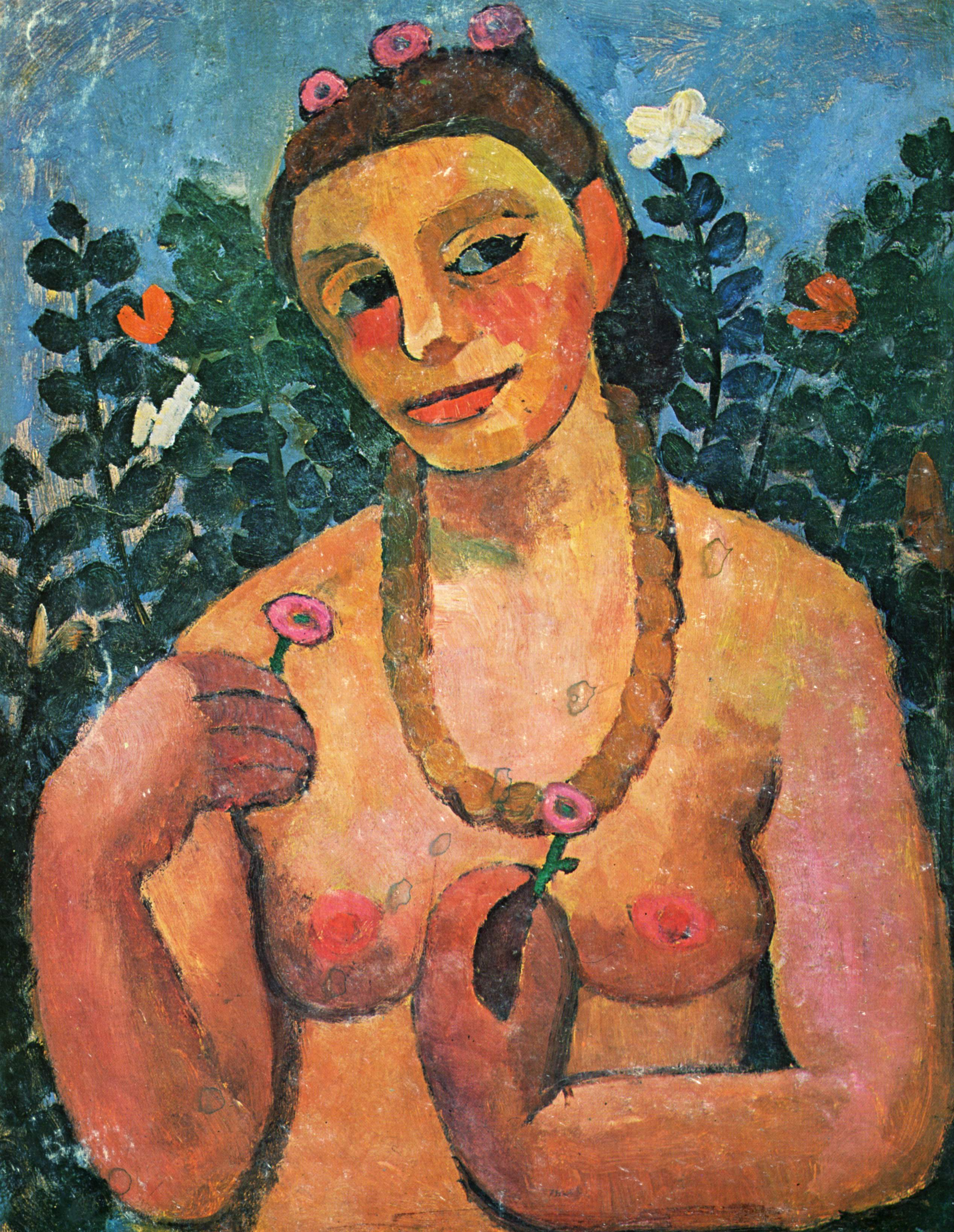
Self-Portrait:
Nude with Amber Necklace Half-Length II (1906)

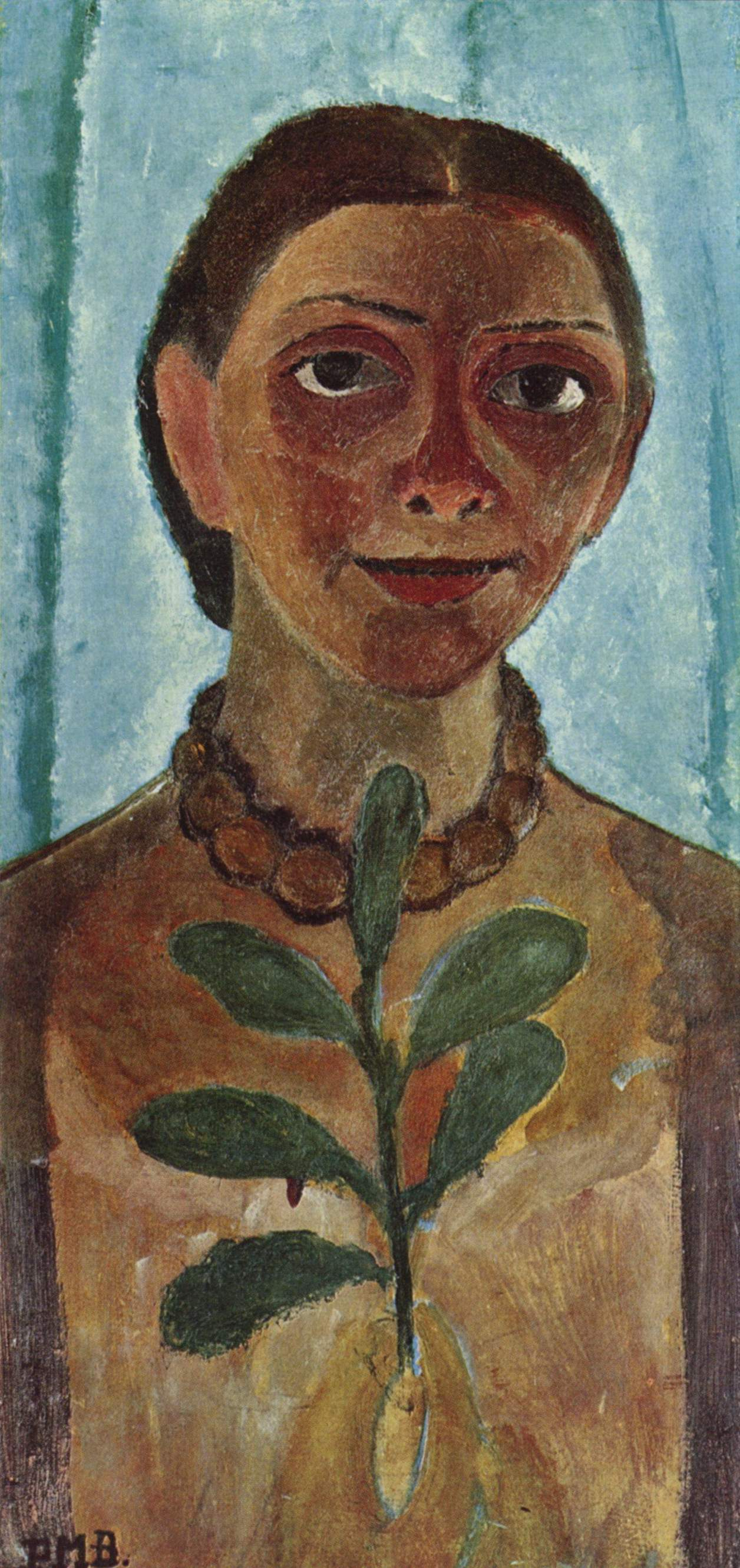
Self-portrait:
The Painter with Camilla Branch (1907)

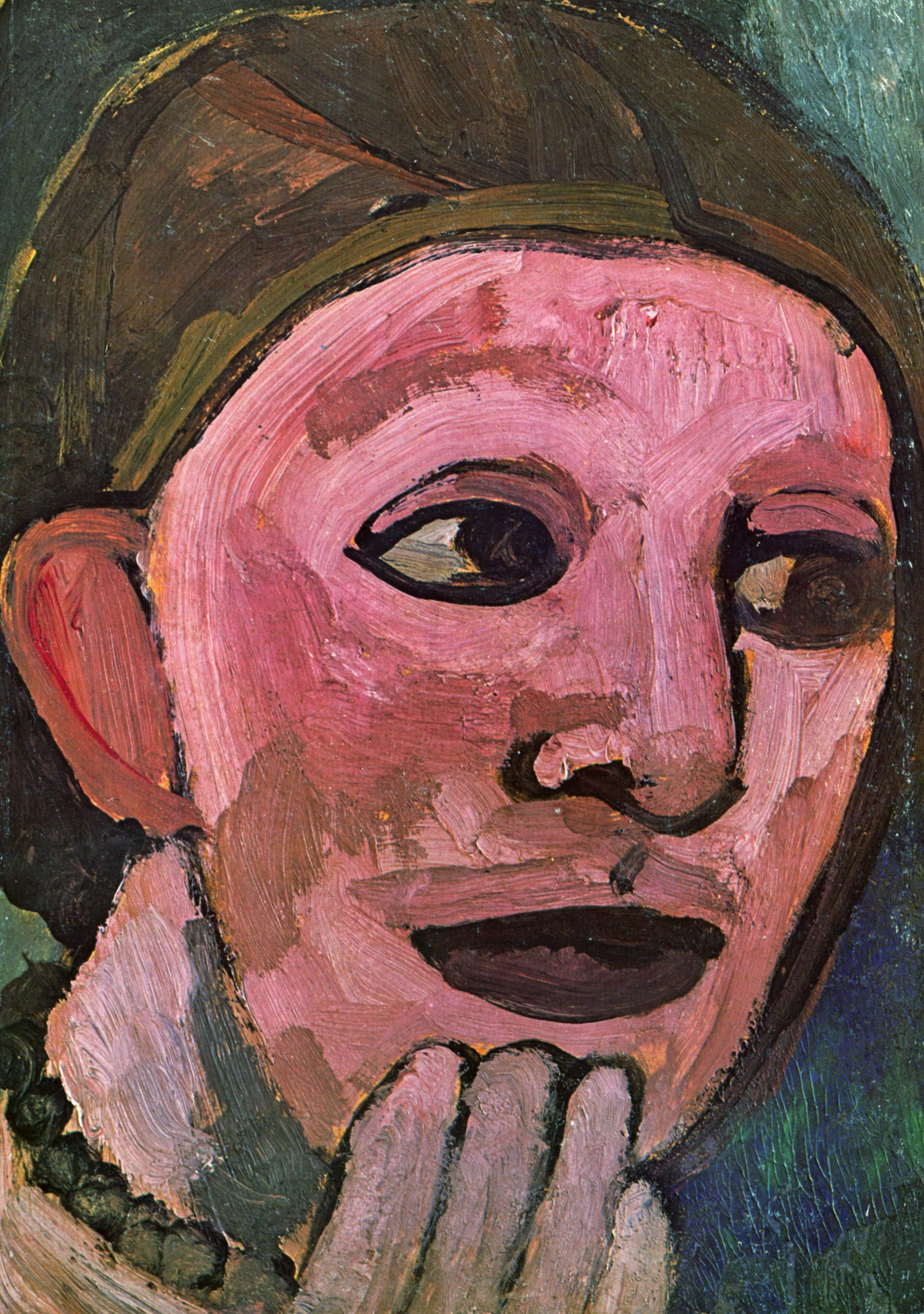
Self-portrait
(1907)

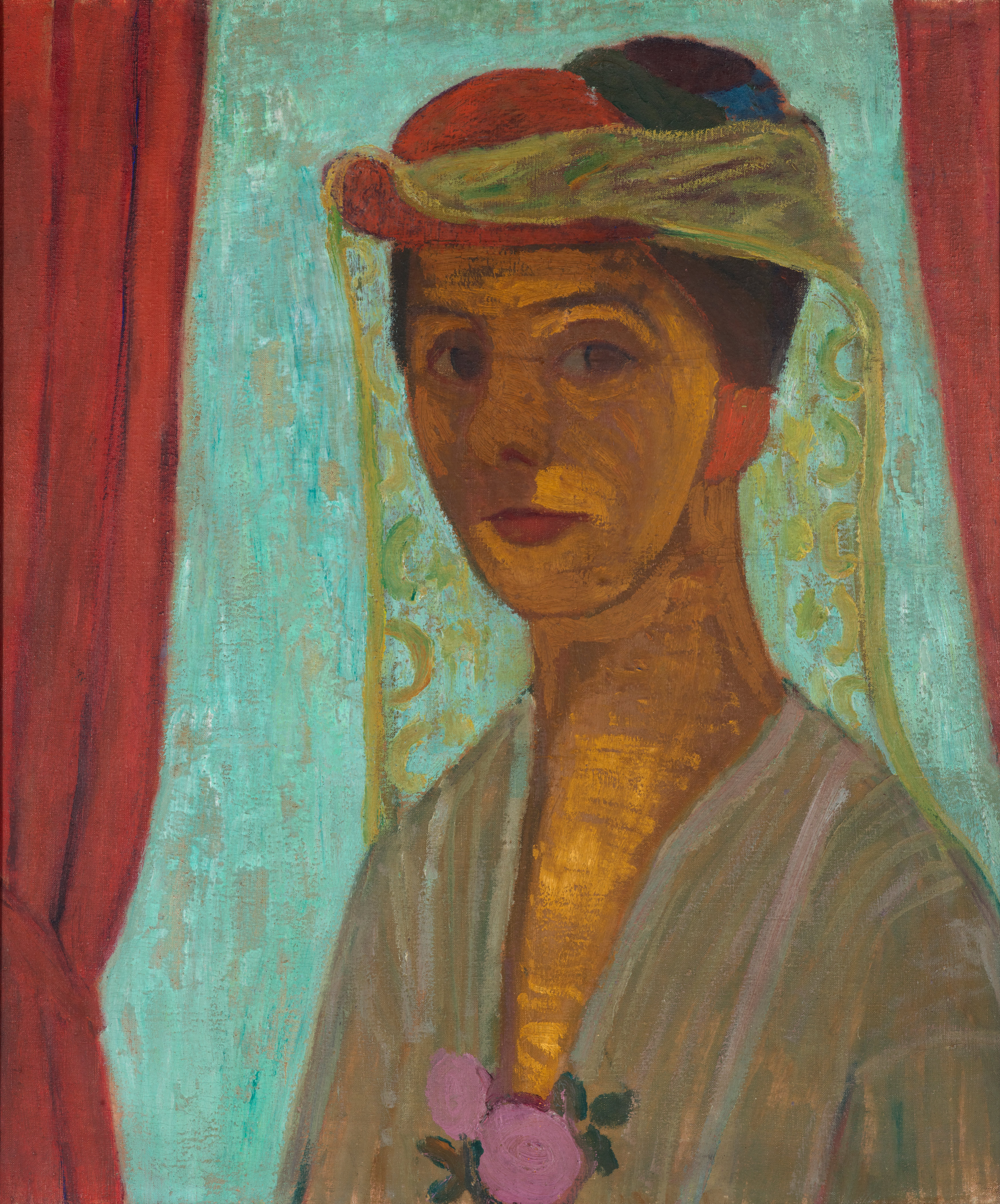
Self-Portrait with Hat and Veil
(1907)

=== Still lifes ===
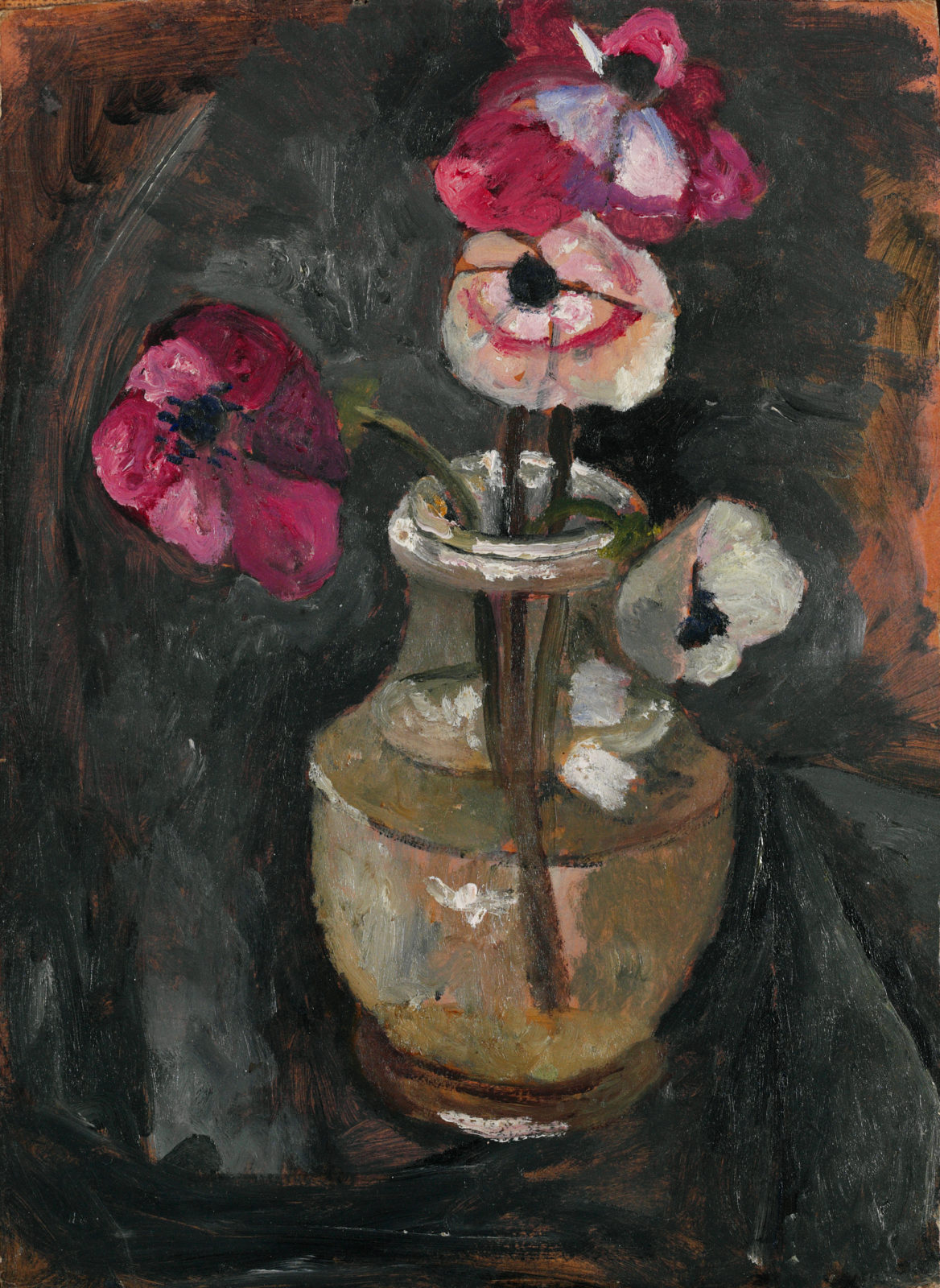
Vase with anemones
(1904)

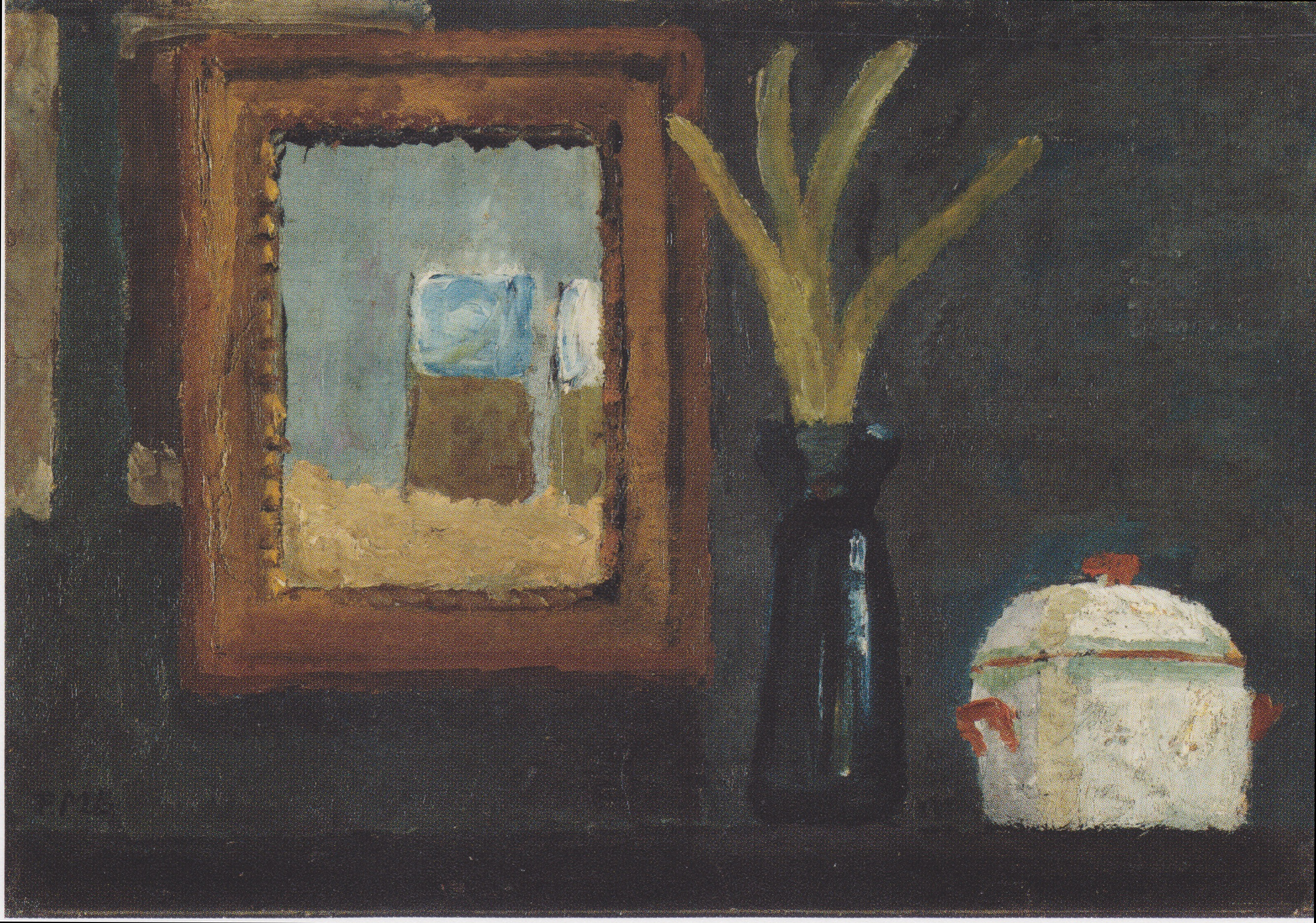
Still life with a sugar bowl and hyacinth
in a glass (c. 1905)

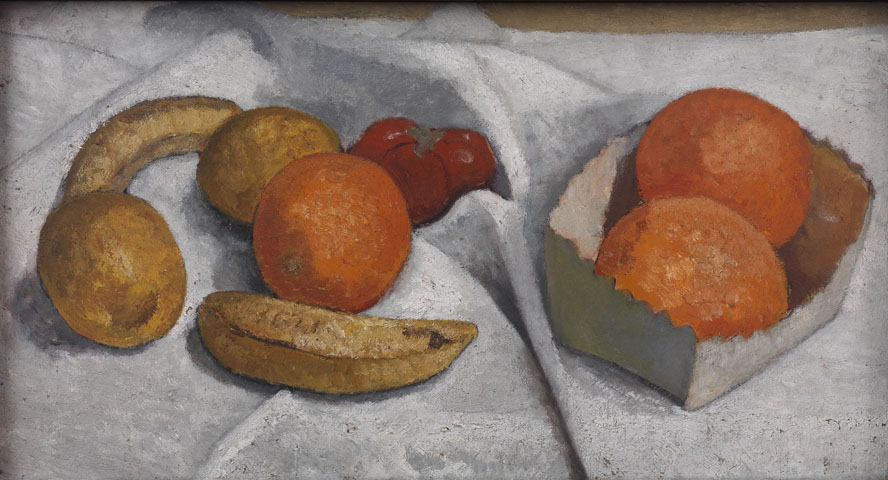
Still life with oranges, bananas, lemon and tomato
(1906) State Art Gallery in Karlsruhe

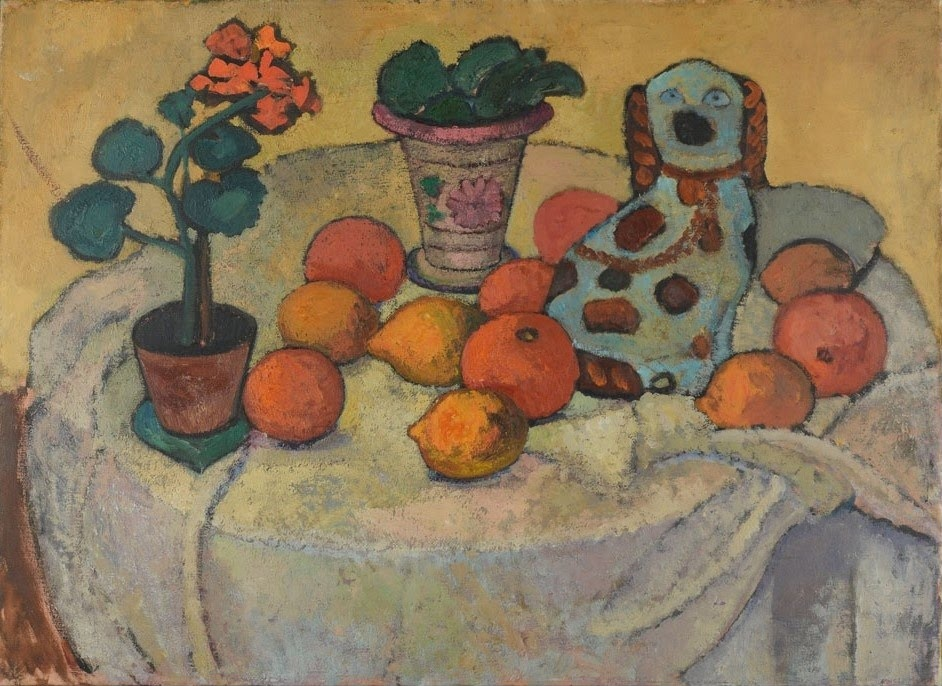
Still Life with Oranges and Stoneware Dog
(1906–07)

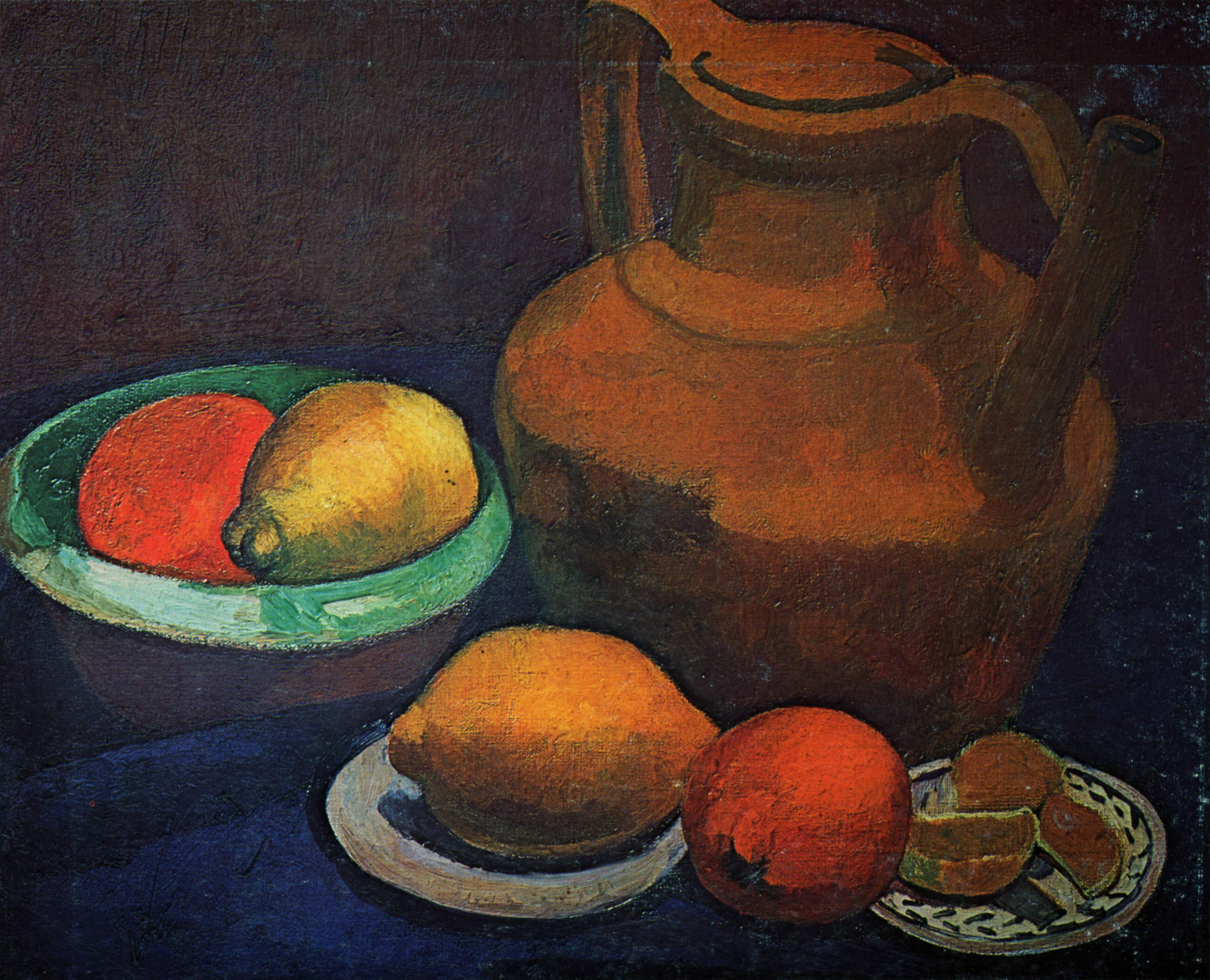
Still life with clay jug
(1907)

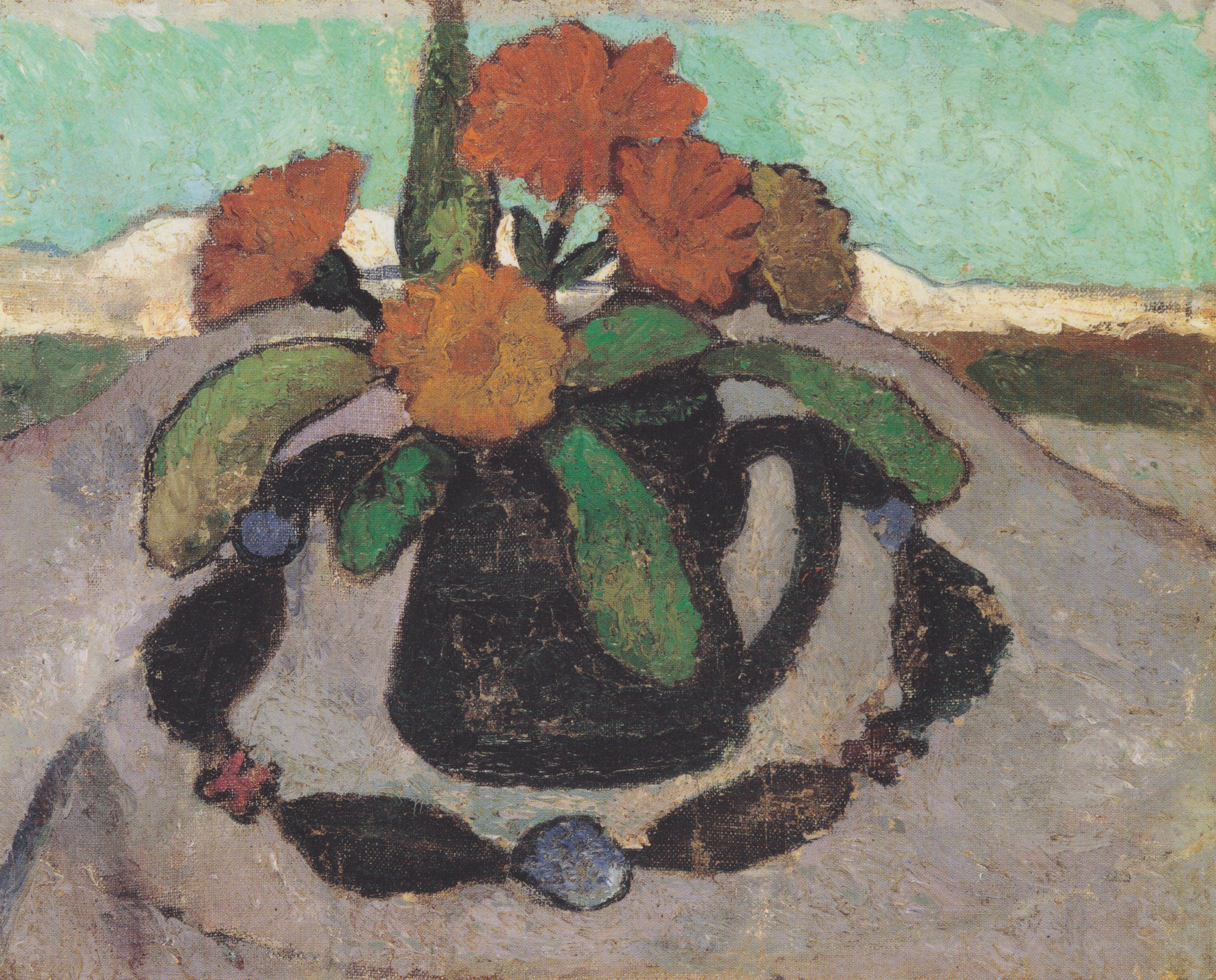
Still life with marigolds in front of a landscape
(1907)

=== Portraits ===
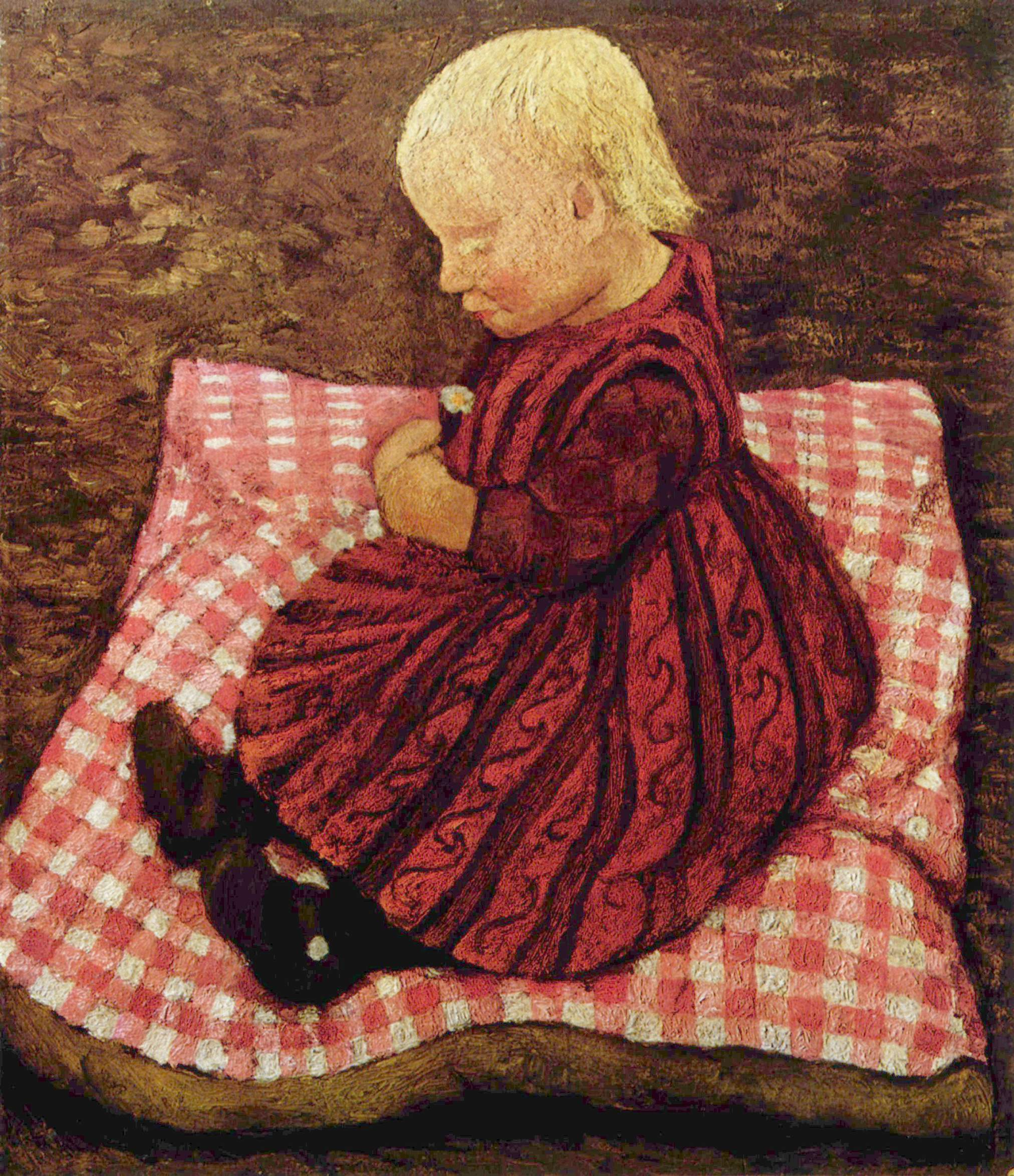
Elsbeth Modersohn on a red pillow (c. 1904)

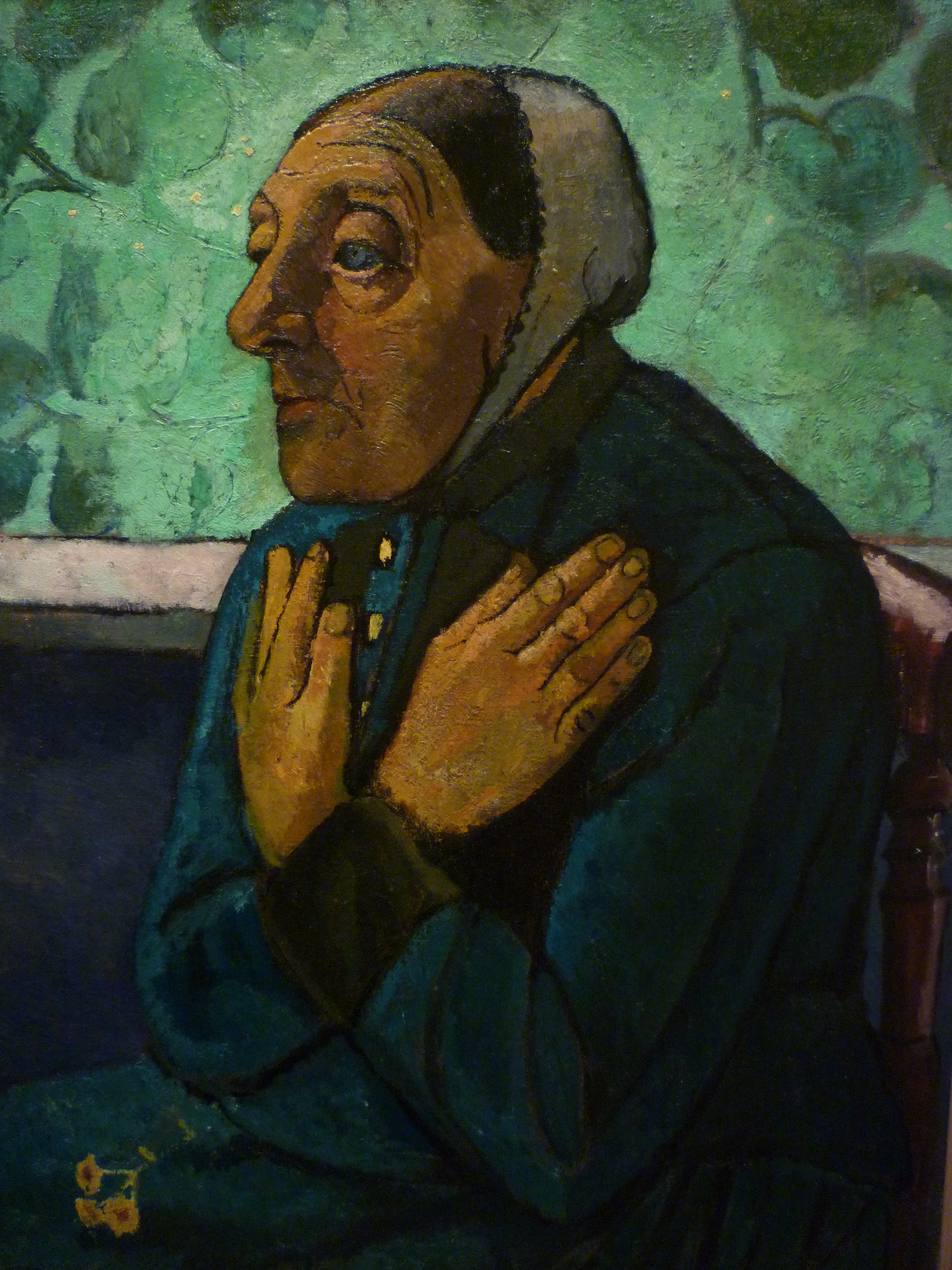
Old Peasant Woman (1907)

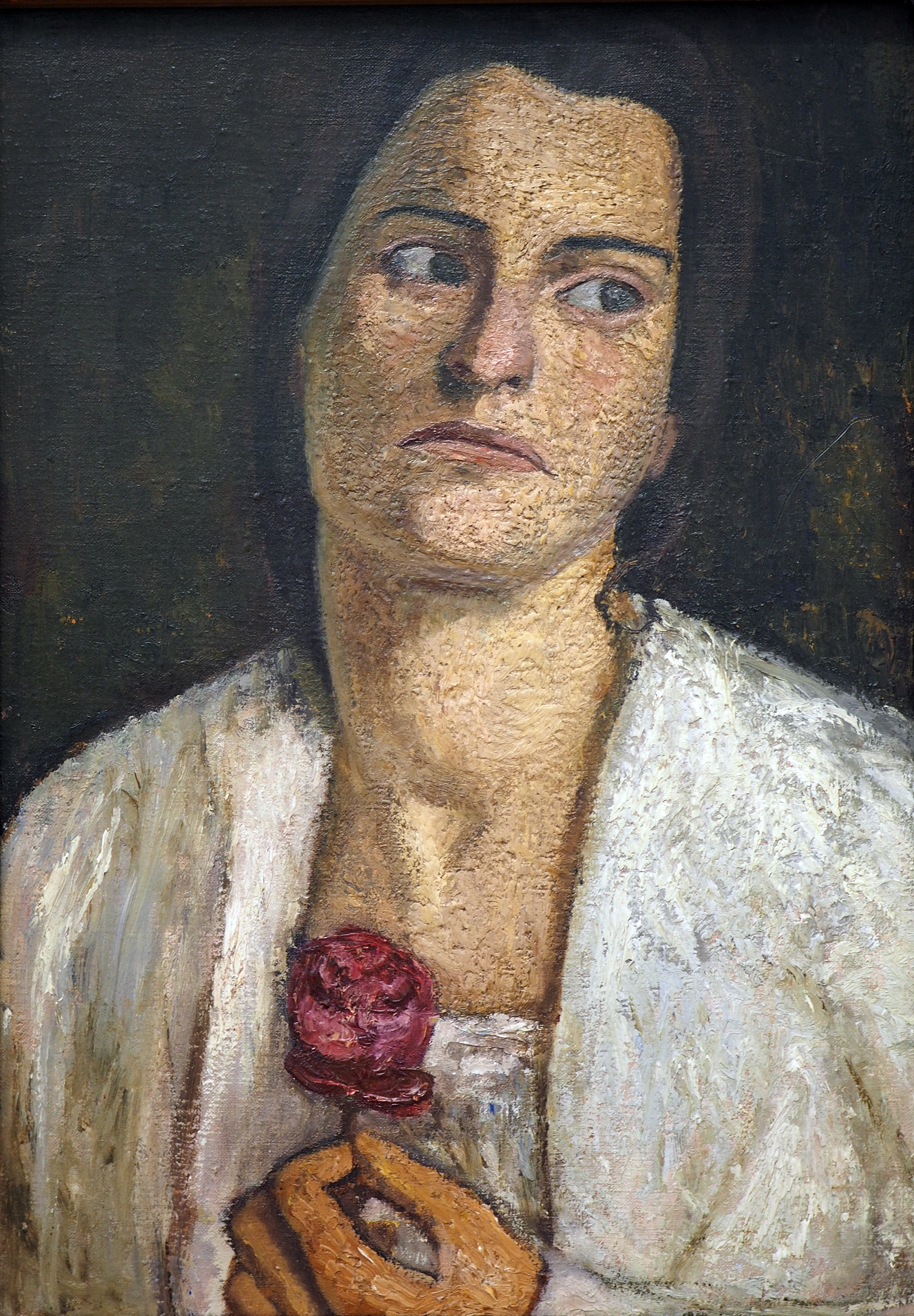
Klara Rilke-Westhoff (1905) Hamburger Kunsthalle

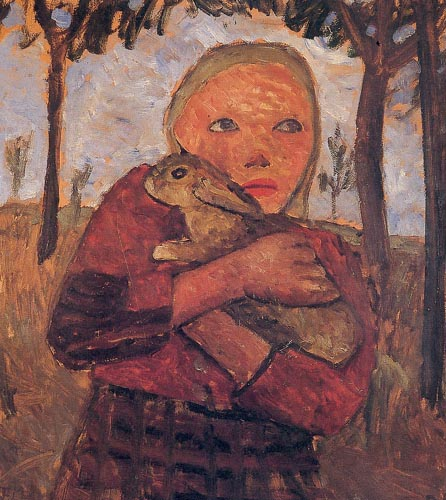
Elsbeth Modersohn with a rabbit (1905)

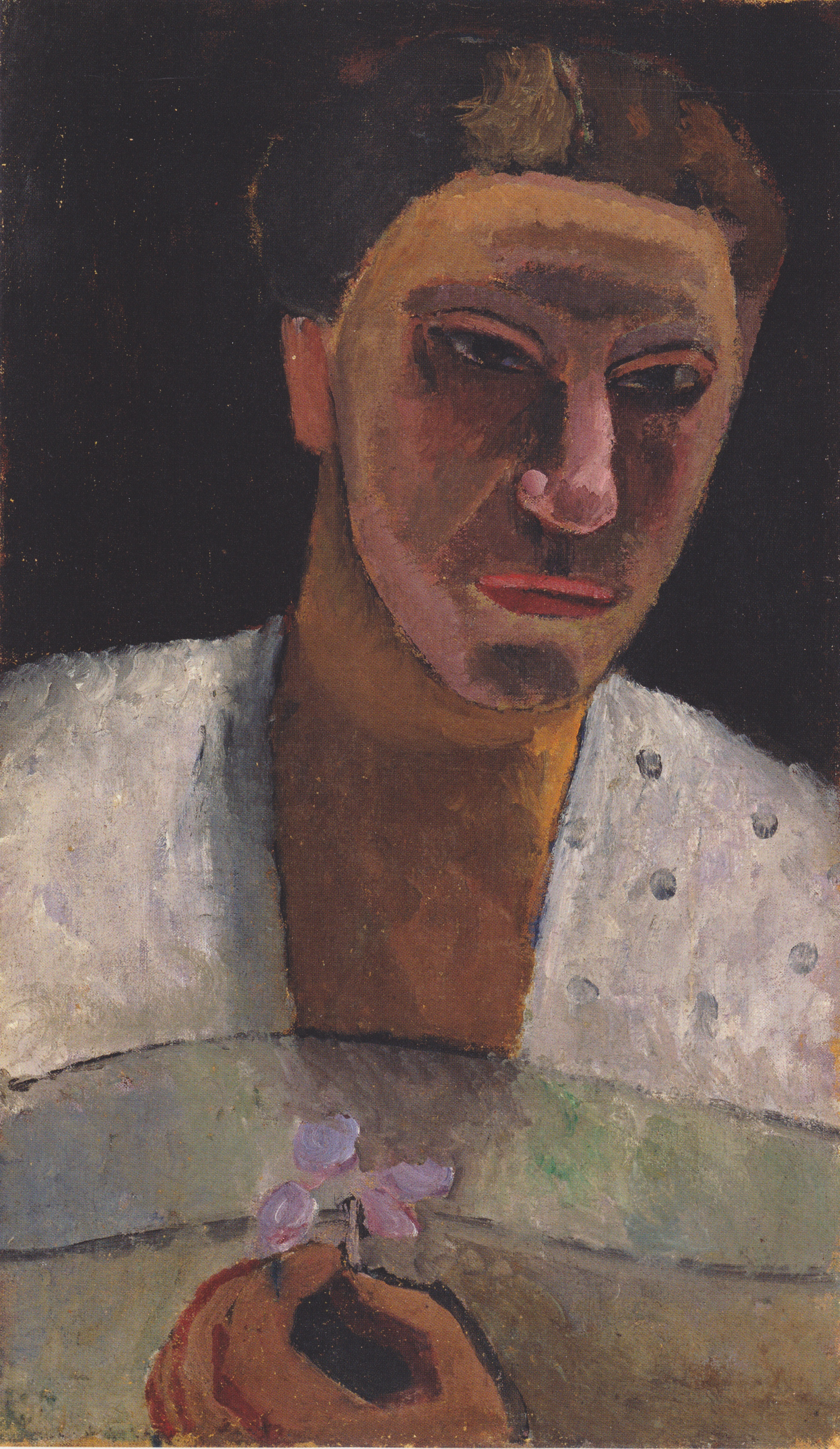
Lee Hoetger with flower
(1906)

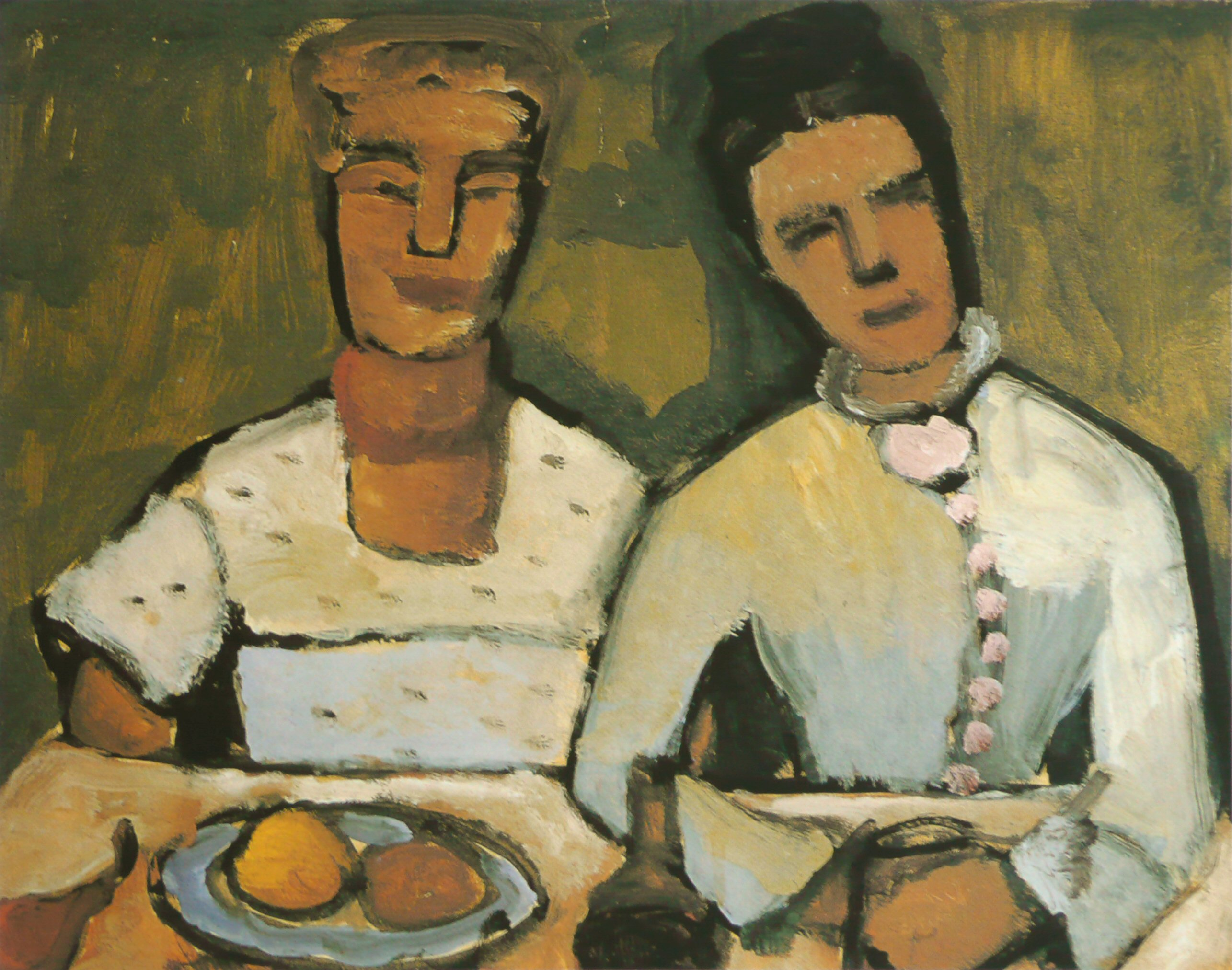
Lee Hoetger and her sister (1906–07)

== See also ==
- Der Blaue Reiter
- Die Brücke
- List of German women artists
- Paula Modersohn-Becker Museum

== Bibliography ==
- Marina Bohlmann-Modersohn: Paula Modersohn-Becker. Eine Biographie mit Briefen. 3. Auflage. Knaus, Berlin 1997, ISBN 3-8135-2594-5
- Janet M.C. Burns: "Looking as Women: The Paintings of Suzanne Valadon, Paula Modersohn-Becker and Frida Kahlo". Atlantis, vol. 18, no 1&2 (1993):25-46.
- Günther Busch, Liselotte von Reinken, Arthur S. Wensinger, Carole Clew Hoey: Paula Modersohn-Becker, The Letters and Journals. Northwestern University Press, 1990
- Jay A. Clark and Jill Lloyd, eds. Paula Modersohn-Becker: Ich Bin Ich / I Am Me. Munich, London, New York: Prestel Publishing, 2024 (Exhibition catalog)
- Marie Darrieussecq: Being Here: The Life of Paula Modersohn-Becker, translated from the French by Penny Hueston. The Text Publishing Company, Melbourne, Australia.
- Anne Higonnet: "Making Babies, Painting Bodies: Women, Art, and Paula Modersohn-Becker's Productivity." Woman's Art Journal, vol. 30, no. 2 (2009):15-21, illus.
- Averil King, Paula Modersohn-Becker. Antique Collectors Club, 2006
- Paula Modersohn-Becker: The Letters and Journals of Paula Modersohn-Becker. Translated & annotated by J. Diane Radycki. Introduction by Alessandra Comini
- Epilogue of poetry by Rainer Maria Rilke (Requiem, 1908, translated by Adrienne Rich & Lilly Engler) and by Adrienne Rich ("Paula Becker to Clara Westhoff", 1975–76). Metuchen, N.J. & London: The Scarecrow Press, Inc., 1980. ISBN 0-8108-1344-0
- Paula Modersohn-Becker, Sophie Dorothee Gallwitz: Eine Künstlerin: Paula Becker-Modersohn. Briefe und Tagebuchblätter. Kestner-Gesellschaft, Hanover, 1917
- Gillian Perry: Paula Modersohn-Becker: Her Life and Work. Harper & Row, 1979
- Diane Radycki: "American Women Artists in Munich, or Die Frauen ohne Schatten." In: American Artists in Munich: Artistic Migration and Cultural Exchange Processes, eds. Christian Fuhrmeister, Hubertus Kohle and Veerle Thielemans, pp. 109–24, illus. Modersohn-Becker & O'Keeffe. Berlin, München: Deutscher Kunstverlag, 2009. ISBN 978-3-422-06833-9
- Diane Radycki: "Paula Modersohn-Becker: The Gendered Discourse in Modernism." Ph.D. dissertation, Harvard University, 1993 (readers: Konrad Oberhuber and Norman Bryson). UMI 93–31,015
- Diane Radycki: "Pictures of Flesh: Modersohn-Becker and the Nude". Woman's Art Journal, vol. 30, no. 2 (2009):3-14, illus. home.moravian.edu
- Diane Radycki: "Pretty/Ugly: Morphing Paula Modersohn-Becker and Marie Laurencin". Make, no. 72 (1996):19-21, illus.
- Diane Radycki: Paula Modersohn-Becker: The First Modern Woman Artist. Yale University Press, 2013
- Diane Radycki: Paula Modersohn-Becker: Self-Portrait. The Museum of Modern Art, 2018.
- Rainer Stamm: "Paula Modersohn-Becker and the Body in Art". Woman's Art Journal, vol. 30, no. 2 (2009):22-24, illus.
- Monica J. Strauss: "Helen Serger's Galerie La Boetie: Paula Modersohn-Becker on Madison Avenue." Woman's Art Journal, vol. 30, no. 2 (2009):32-35, illus.
- Eric Torgersen: Dear Friend: Rainer Maria Rilke and Paula Modersohn-Becker. Northwestern University Press, 1998
- Gustav Pauli, Paula Modersohn-Becker, Berlin: Wolff, 1919; 3rd ed., 1934
- Waldemar Augustiny, Paula Modersohn-Becker, Gutersloh: Mohn, 1960, Paula Modersohn-Becker, Hildesheim, 1971
- Ellen C. Oppler, "Paula Modersohn-Becker: Some facts and legends", Art Journal, xxxv, Summer 1976, pp. 364–369
- Christa Murken-Altrogge, Paula Modersohn-Becker: Leben und Werk, Cologne: Du Mont, 1980
- Gunter Busch, Paula Modersohn-Becker: Malerin, Zeichnerin, Frankfurt am Main: Fischer, 1981
- Frank Laukötter: Paula Modersohn-Becker. The Great Masters of Art, Hirmer Publishers, Munich 2020, ISBN 978-3-7774-3489-6.
