= Self-Portrait Looking Slightly Left =

Painting by Paula Modersohn-Becker

- Selbstbildnis nach halblinks (German)
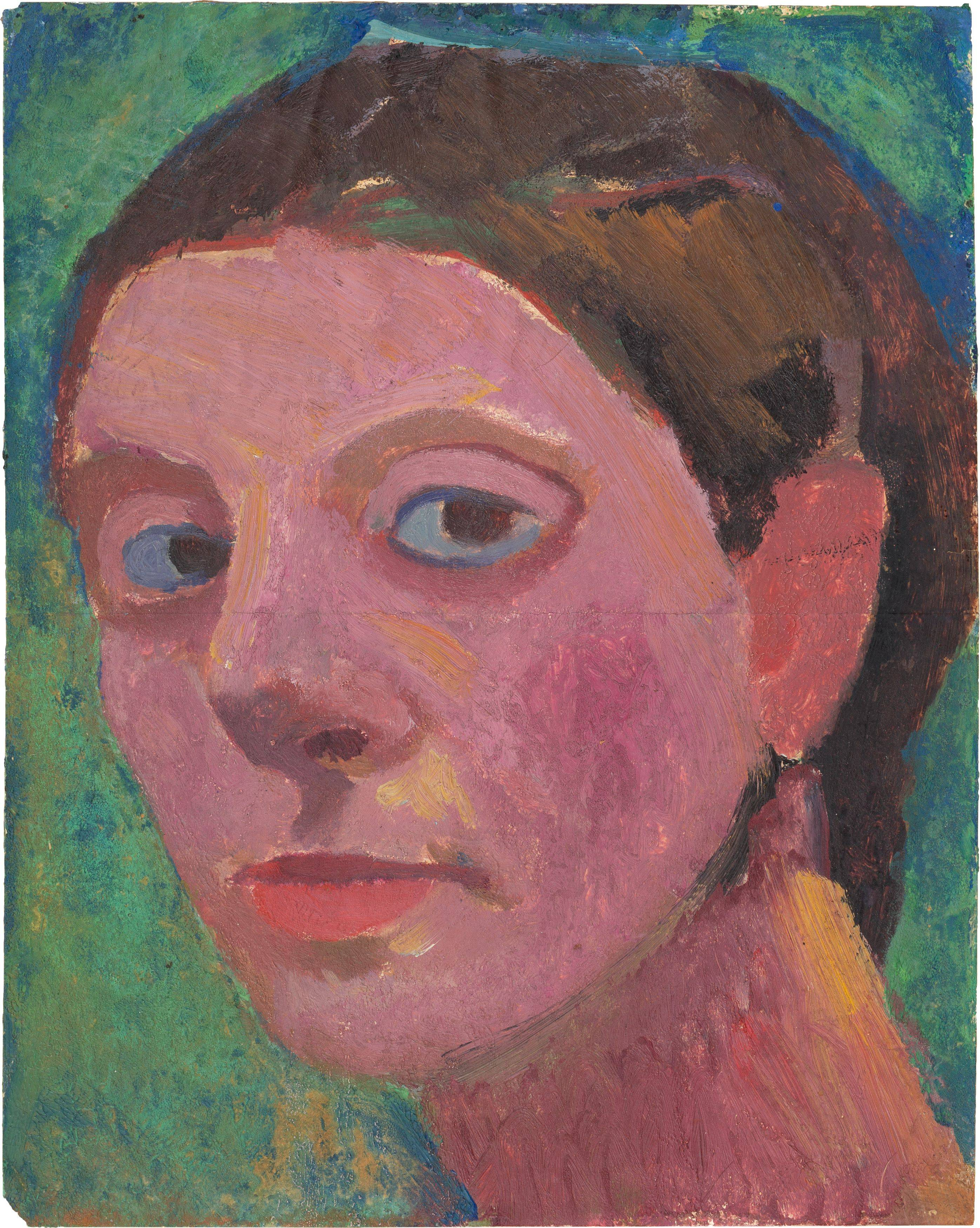
- Artist: Paula Modersohn-Becker
- Year: 1906
- Medium: oil on paper
- Dimensions: 26.8 cm × 21.4 cm (10.6 in × 8.4 in)
- Location: Private collection

Self-Portrait Looking Slightly Left is an oil on paper painting by German artist Paula Modersohn-Becker, from 1906. It is held in a private collection.

== History and description ==
The self-portrait is of very small dimensions and depicts the artist head and neck, as she is looking slightly from the left of the viewer. It is considerably smaller and more focused in her head and expression than most of her self-portraits. Her head fills almost entirely the space, with only a small part of the greenish background visible.

Like other of her self-portraits, she seems to have been influenced by the Fayum mummy portraits, that she saw at the Louvre, in 1903.

The painting was originally in the Behnhaus Museum, in Lübeck, until it was confiscated by the Nazis, in 1937, because it was considered degenerate art.

== Art market ==
The painting became the best selling of the artist when it sold by €1,270,000 ($1,159,872) at Grisebach auction house, in Berlin, well above the €250,000–€350,000 estimate. It was bought after a competitive bid by a European private collector.
