= Old Peasant Woman =

Painting by Paula Modersohn-Becker

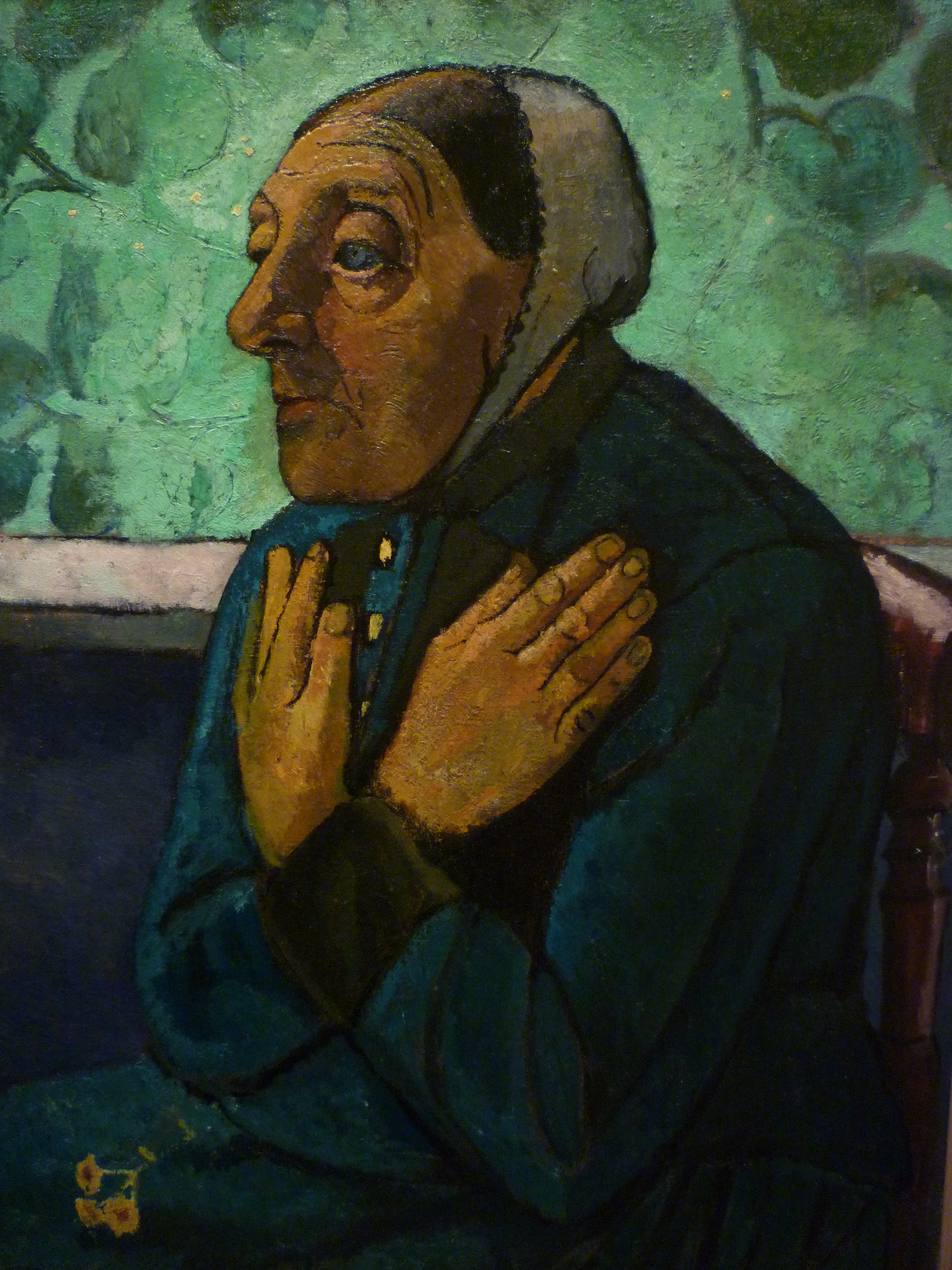
- Artist: Paula Modersohn-Becker
- Year: 1907
- Medium: oil on canvas
- Dimensions: 75.6 cm × 57.8 cm (29.8 in × 22.8 in)
- Location: Detroit Institute of Arts, Detroit

Old Peasant Woman is an oil on canvas painting by German artist Paula Modersohn-Becker, from 1907. It is held at the Detroit Institute of Arts.

== History and description ==
The artist took an interest by the rural life of Worpswede, a German northern village, particularly by their peasants, while staying at a local community of artists. Some sites claim that the painting was made c. 1905, but the official museum website gives the date of 1907. The model for this painting was an old woman from a poor family, whom she depicted several times. After her last visit to Paris, in 1906-1907, she had absorved the influence of Vincent van Gogh, Paul Gauguin and Paul Cézanne, in their depictions of people of humble condition. In her own words, she aimed for “the utmost simplicity united with the most intimate power of observation”.

The old lady is seated and dressed in blue. She is still, her eyes seems calm, but her arms are crossed in her bosom, indicating that she is in prayer. A small yellow flower is on her lap. The setting is unspecified. Despite the old age of the sitter, the painting seems to have been inspired by the Annunciation.

Deborah Lewer states that "The posture of prayer that this old peasant adopts in a distant German village most closely echoes the virgin annunciate’s gesturing of humility and acceptance."

== Provenance ==
The painting was acquired by the Hamburger Kunsthalle, in 1919. It was purged by the Nazis, in 1937, during their campaign against what they called degenerate art, and sold in the international art market. An American private collector offered it to the Detroit Institute of Arts, in 1958.
