= Self-Portrait with Hat and Veil =

Painting by Paula Modersohn-Becker

Self-portrait with hat and veil
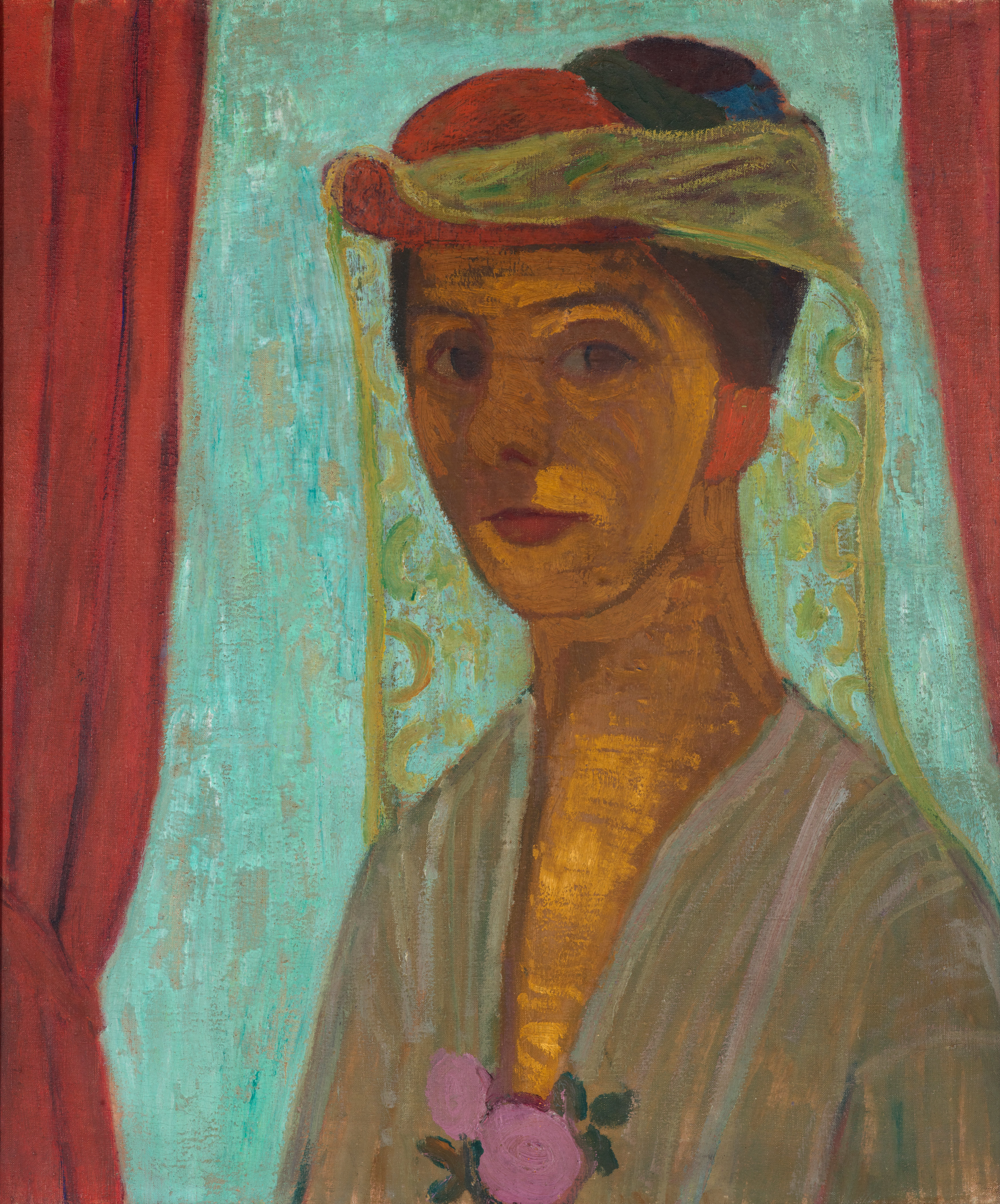
- Year: 1900s
- Dimensions: 89.6 cm (35.3 in) × 79.8 cm (31.4 in)
- Location: Kunstmuseum Den Haag
- Accession: 0333022

Self-Portrait with Hat and Veil is an oil on canvas painting by the German Expression painter Paula Modersohn-Becker, from c. 1906-1907. It hangs in the Kunstmuseum, in The Hague.

== History and description ==
It has been described as an impenetrable, secret painting: "the artist stands in front of a draped window, her face both in shadow and covered by a veil, doubly concealing the backlit figure from public viewing. Only the deep V-shape of her garment suggests exposure of any kind, and even there the flower held just at the breast both hints at and denies a fuller view."
