= Self-Portrait as a Tahitian =

1934 painting by Amrita Sher-Gil

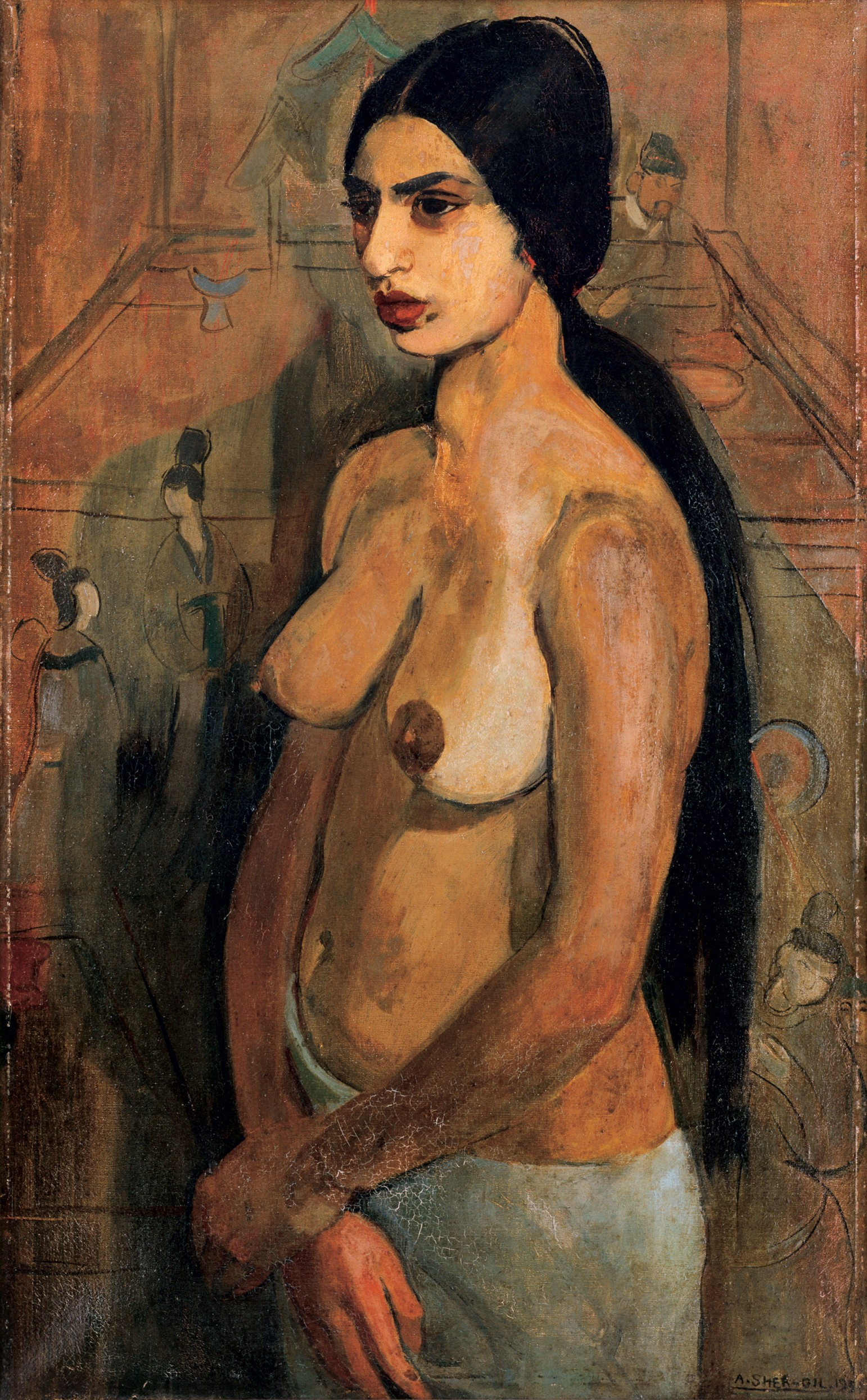
- Artist: Amrita Sher-Gil
- Year: 1934
- Medium: Oil on canvas
- Dimensions: 90 cm × 56 cm (35 in × 22 in)
- Location: Kiran Nadar Museum of Art, Delhi

Self-Portrait as a Tahitian is a self-portraiture, an oil painting on canvas created in 1934 in Paris by Hungarian-born Indian artist Amrita Sher-Gil. It is held in the Kiran Nadar Museum of Art, India. Under India's Antiquities and Art Treasures Act (1972) the work is a national art treasure and must stay in India.

In the painting Sher-Gil is portrayed in partial nudity in the shadow of an unknown male figure. A plain white cloth is wrapped around her lower body, leaving her slightly protruding abdomen, full body breasts and crossed arms naked. She is standing, with smaller Oriental figures in the background.

In 1934 the painting was exhibited at the Salon des Tuileries, Paris, alongside her 1932 portrait of her friend Boris Taslitzky, Young Man with Apples. The work has been seen as Sher-Gil's response to seeing Paul Gauguin's Faa Iheihe in London in 1933, and hence a tribute to him, with a combination of east and west. Paula Modersohn-Becker's Self-Portrait at 6th Wedding Anniversary was also likely familiar to her. Critics have varied in their view of the extent of influence by Vincent van Gogh.

== Amrita Sher-Gil ==
Amrita Sher-Gil (1913–1941) was born in Hungary to an Indian aristocrat and his Hungarian Jewish wife, an opera singer. After the First World War, the family moved to Shimla, India. There, she was influenced by her uncle, Ervin Baktay, who encouraged her to carefully observe the reality around her and transfer it to her work, particularly using live models. At his suggestion, the family moved to Paris so that she could study art, first at the Académie de la Grande Chaumière and later the Beaux-Arts de Paris, as a 16-year-old. Her mentors included Pierre Henri Vaillant and Lucien Simon. Nineteen of Sher-Gil's works were self-portraits painted in Europe between 1930 and 1934. Two of those works included one in a blue sari, being later completed in India.

== Origin and composition ==
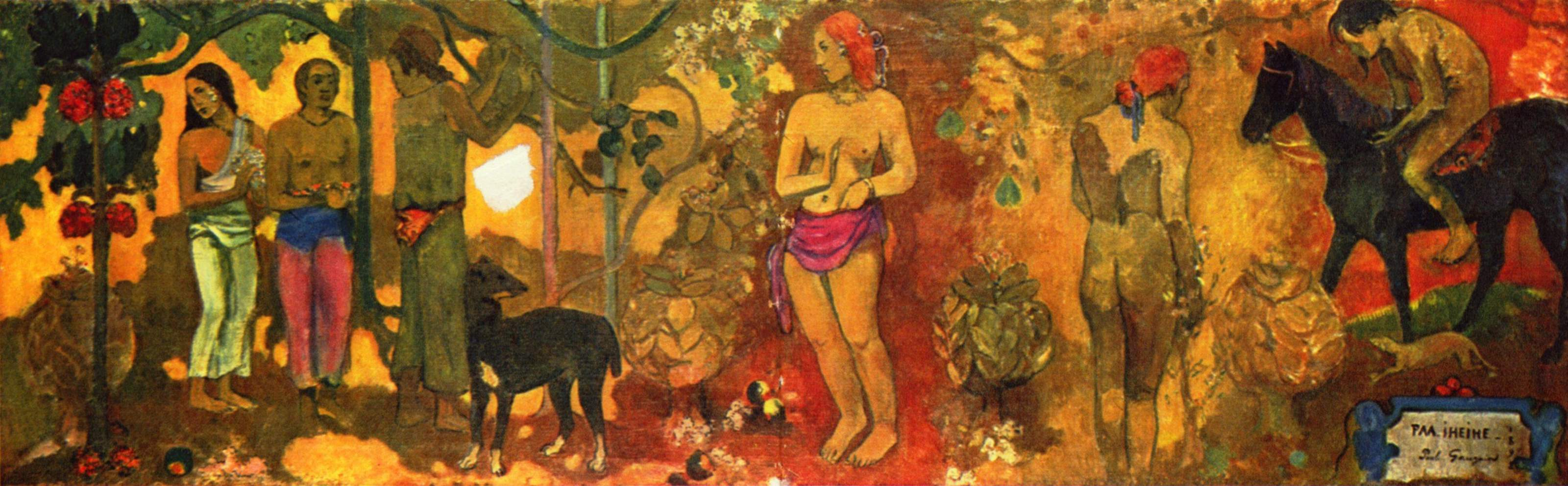
Paul Gauguin's Faa Iheihe (1898)

Sher-Gil created Self-Portrait as a Tahitian in oil on canvas in early 1934, while she was studying at the Beaux-Arts de Paris. The previous year she had visited the Tate Gallery in London, where she saw Paul Gauguin's Faa Iheihe (1898). In January 1934, Sher-Gil told her parents that she took a "Chinese picture away to the atelier", hoping "to paint a picture in which it will play a large role". Her nephew, Vivan Sundaram, in his study of her letters, took this note to refer to Self-Portrait as a Tahitian.

The painting measures 90 cm by 56 cm, and is held in the Kiran Nadar Museum of Art, India. It is a self-portrait depicting Sher-Gil in partial nudity. A plain white cloth is wrapped around her lower body, leaving her slightly protruding abdomen, full body and breasts, and crossed long arms naked. She is standing in the shadow of an unknown man, with smaller Japanese or Chinese figures in the background. Her body is varying shades of brown, and her long straight black hair is casually tied back. A deep red is used to colour the slightly smirked lips. Her posture is turned a little so that she is looking away from the viewer.

== Exhibition ==
In 1934 the work was exhibited at the Salon des Tuileries, Paris. In April of that year, she wrote to her friend Denise Proutaux that she was allowed to exhibit five paintings at the Salon, and being the last chance to, as her return to India was planned for later that year, she hoped to display her Self-Portrait as a Tahitian along with her 1932 portrait of her friend Boris Taslitzky, Young Man with Apples, and it did. Sher-Gil wrote "they will go well together, a good contrast: with one in blues and yellows (it's a nude you do not know, I started it after you left), and the other in harmony of pink and white." Proutaux later recalled that Sher-Gil wore a sari to the exhibition, "a rare spectacle in the streets of Paris". It was so successful that Sher-Gil and other participating artists had to take refuge in a cafe.

== Influences ==
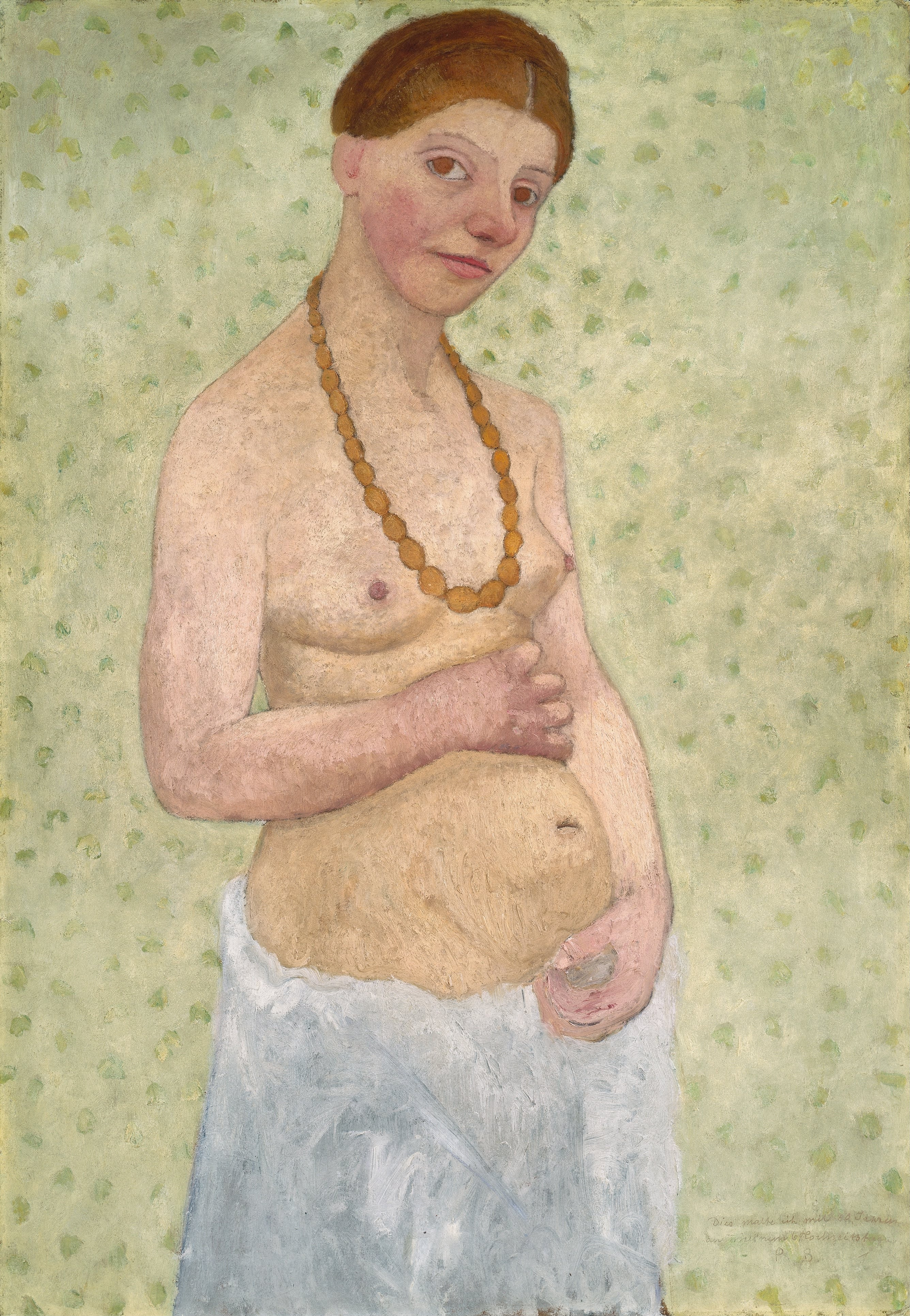
Self-Portrait at 6th Wedding Anniversary by Paula Modersohn-Becker (1906)

The painting has been seen as Sher-Gil's response to seeing Faa Iheihe, and hence a tribute to Gauguin, with a combination of east and west, and where Sher-Gil sees herself as "the exotic other". Sher-Gil was also influenced by how Van Gogh presented Japonisme.

Like Paula Modersohn-Becker's Self-Portrait at 6th Wedding Anniversary, Self-Portrait As a Tahitian depicts a woman with early signs of pregnancy through her slightly rounded abdomen and full breasts. Sher-Gil had also been pregnant, and been through two terminations. The painting by Modersohn-Becker was likely familiar to her.

== Interpretation ==
Art critics W. G. Archer and Karl J. Khandalavala saw Sher-Gil as obsessed with Gauguin to the extent that it partly "haunted her". To them, her longing to return to India connected her to Gauguin's "sun-hotted joyous exuberant colours" and according to Archer, to Sher-Gil "India was Gauguin, and when at last she returned, India itself became Gauguin". Bringing the issue of "race" to attention, philosopher Nalini Bhushan sees Sher-Gil as depicting the Indian part of herself, with the Tahitian representing the perfectly appearing non-European. However, in contrast to Sher-Gil's portrayal of herself as a Tahitian, Gauguin's Tahitians are more elaborately dressed, are decorated with flowers, and typically appear as seductive women on a tropical landscape.

Saloni Mathur, professor of Modern and Contemporary South Asian Art, gives an alternative take. In her article "A Retake of Sher-Gil's Self-Portrait as Tahitian" (2011), she asks herself "What precisely was meant by Sher-Gil’s self-conscious self-placement into the body of a Tahitian nude?" Her interpretation is that the painting "conceals a deep engagement with the strategies of self-portraiture and acts of masquerade undertaken by both Gauguin and Vincent van Gogh in the late 1880s". Describing the image as "striking in her composure; she is resolutely female, self-possessed, and full of repose", Mathur proposes that Sher-Gil's self-portrait is not just a tribute to Gauguin or simply an example of neo-primitivism. According to her, the influence of Van Gogh has been underestimated, and she makes reference to Van Gogh's Portrait of Père Tanguy, which similarly has Japanese figures in its background. Who the shadowy figure behind Sher-Gil is unclear. Bhushan and Christine Haupt call the "mystifying male shadow" a "voyeur". Mathur postulates it could be a "symbol of the dominating influence of the two painters" Gauguin or Van Gogh, and her "own search for a place for herself within the creation of modernism's master discourse". Haupt suggests that it might represent Sher-Gil's mental state; part of her bipolar personality.

With reference to the slightly turned away depiction of Sher-Gil, Mathur relates this to Sher-Gil's turning towards India, as she longed to return there. She notes that the Indian art critic Geeta Kapur connects Sher-Gil with the artist Frida Kahlo; both representing "women in and through the experience of otherness", and therefore giving an alternative take of the traditional nude.

Yashodhara Dalmia, in her biography of Sher-Gil, calls the painting "Sher-Gil's most dramatic portrait", in which her smirk resonates with Rembrandt's last self-portrait of 1669. In Sonal Khullar's view the painting "theatricalizes the relationship of French masters to the Orient" and "combines and confuses areas of the world: Oceania, the Orient, and the Occident". According to D. Fairchild Ruggles, in this painting, Sher-Gil "claims a history and culture for herself". Pradeep A. Dhillon considers it of "eternal significance".

== Legacy ==
The painting appears on the front cover of Sundaram's study of Sher-Gil titled Amrita Sher-Gil; a self-portrait in letters & writings (2010). The work is a national art treasure under India's Antiquities and Art Treasures Act (1972). As such, it must remain in India and may only leave the country with permission from the Indian Central Government.

== See also ==
- List of paintings by Amrita Sher-Gil

== Bibliography ==
- Dalmia, Yashodhara (2013). Amrita Sher-Gil: A Life. Gurugram: Penguin Books. ISBN 978-0-14-342026-2.
- Khullar, Sonal (2015). Worldly Affiliations: Artistic Practice, National Identity, and Modernism in India, 1930 1990. University of California Press. ISBN 978-0-520-28367-1.
- Sundaram, Vivan (2010). Amrita Sher-Gil: A Self-Portrait in Letters and Writings. Vol. 1. New Delhi: Tulika Books. pp. 1–417. ISBN 978-81-89487-59-1.
- Sundaram, Vivan (2010). Amrita Sher-Gil: A Self-Portrait in Letters and Writings. Vol. 2. New Delhi: Tulika Books. pp. 418–821. ISBN 978-81-89487-59-1.
