= Paula Modersohn-Becker Museum =

Biographical art museum in Bremen, Germany

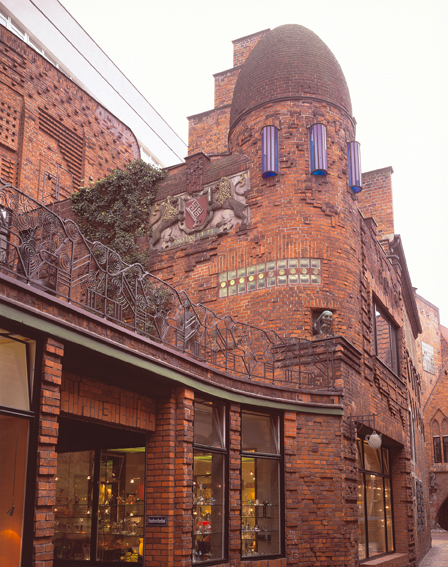
- The Paula-Modersohn-Becker-Museum, Böttcherstraße, Bremen
- Interactive fullscreen map
- Location: Bremen, Germany
- Coordinates: 53°04′31″N 8°48′22″E

The Paula Modersohn-Becker Museum is a biographical art museum in Bremen, Germany. It was the first museum in the world devoted to a female artist, Paula Modersohn-Becker (1876–1907), one of the most important early Expressionists, and the museum features key works from each of her creative periods.

== History ==
Construction of the museum was commissioned by the businessman and art patron Ludwig Roselius, who assigned the sculptor, craftsman and architect Bernhard Hoetger to design it. Hoetger had become acquainted with Modersohn-Becker while in Paris, and created a unique Brick Expressionist building in her memory. Opened in 1927, the museum now counts as one of the key works of expressionist architecture in Germany. The collection features works covering the artist's entire career, from the early pictures of her training years in Berlin to the paintings she created in Paris in 1906-07, in which she most fully realised her artistic vision.

In 1935 local Nazis attacked the art and architecture of the Paula Modersohn-Becker Museum. Ludwig Roselius ignored this but Hitler denounced the art at the September 1936 Nuremberg NSDAP rally and Roselius contemplated suicide. Barbara Goette intervened on Roselius' behalf and Hitler declared the Böttcherstrasse as a monument of 'degenerate art'; the offensive works, including the Paula Modersohn-Becker Museum would not have to be demolished. In exchange Ludwig Roselius pumped capital into Focke-Wulf aircraft company.

Important paintings and drawings from Roselius's collection are supplemented by works on loan from the Paula Modersohn-Becker Foundation. Besides Paula's works, the museum also owns the most extensive collection of works by Bernhard Hoetger (1874–1949). The rooms that he designed are now used for special exhibitions of classic modern art.

Since 1973, the building has been listed under the monument protection act.

The museum is run by the Böttcherstraße GmbH company, named after its location on the architecturally significant Böttcherstraße.

Since 2005, Jenny Holzer's electronic homage For Paula Modersohn-Becker has been permanently installed in the stairwell.

== See also ==
- Self-Portrait at 6th Wedding Anniversary
- List of single-artist museums
