= Atlantis House =

Building in Bremen, Germany

Coordinates: 53°04′29″N 8°48′20″E

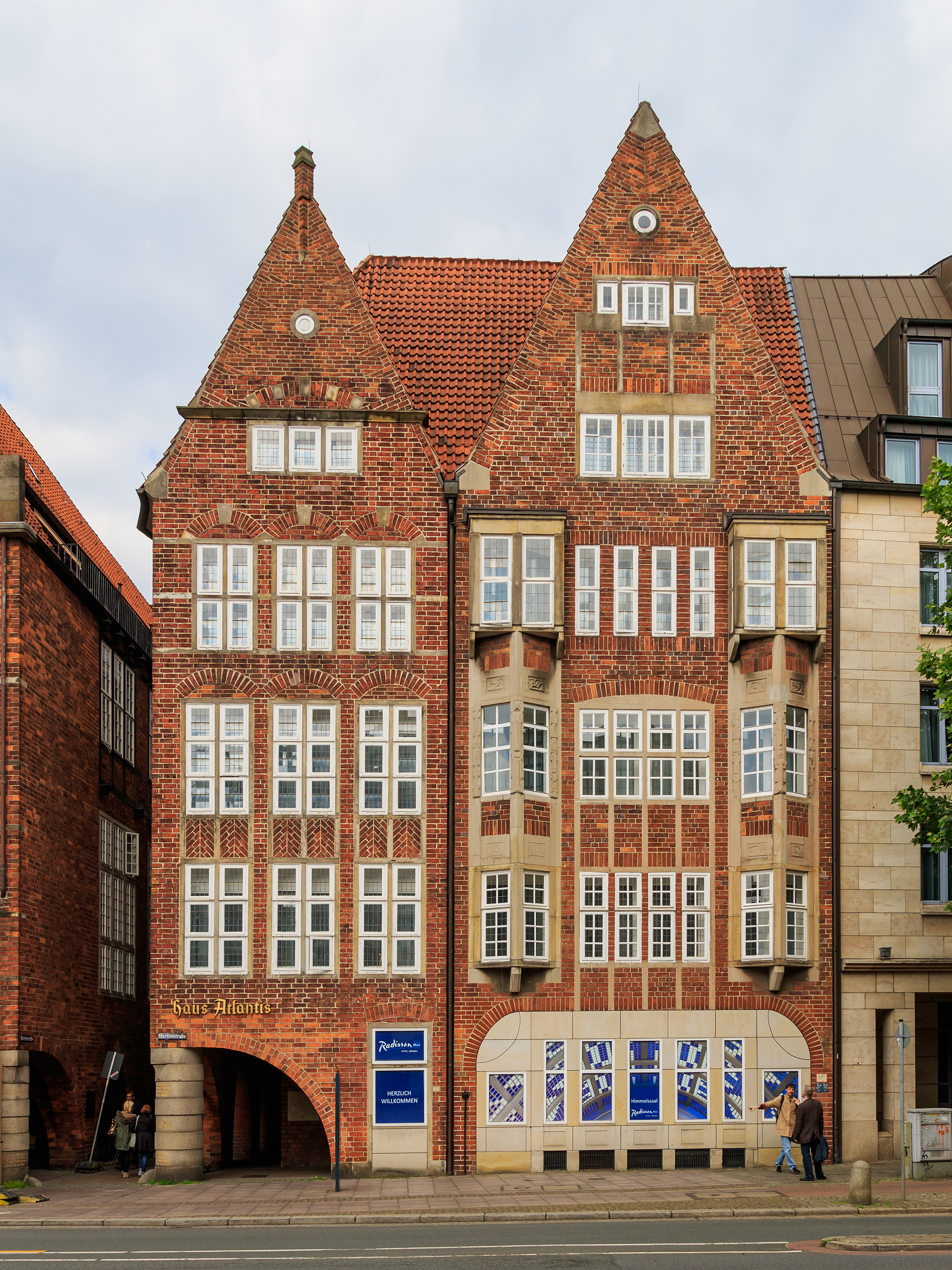
Atlantis House on Bremen's Böttcherstraße

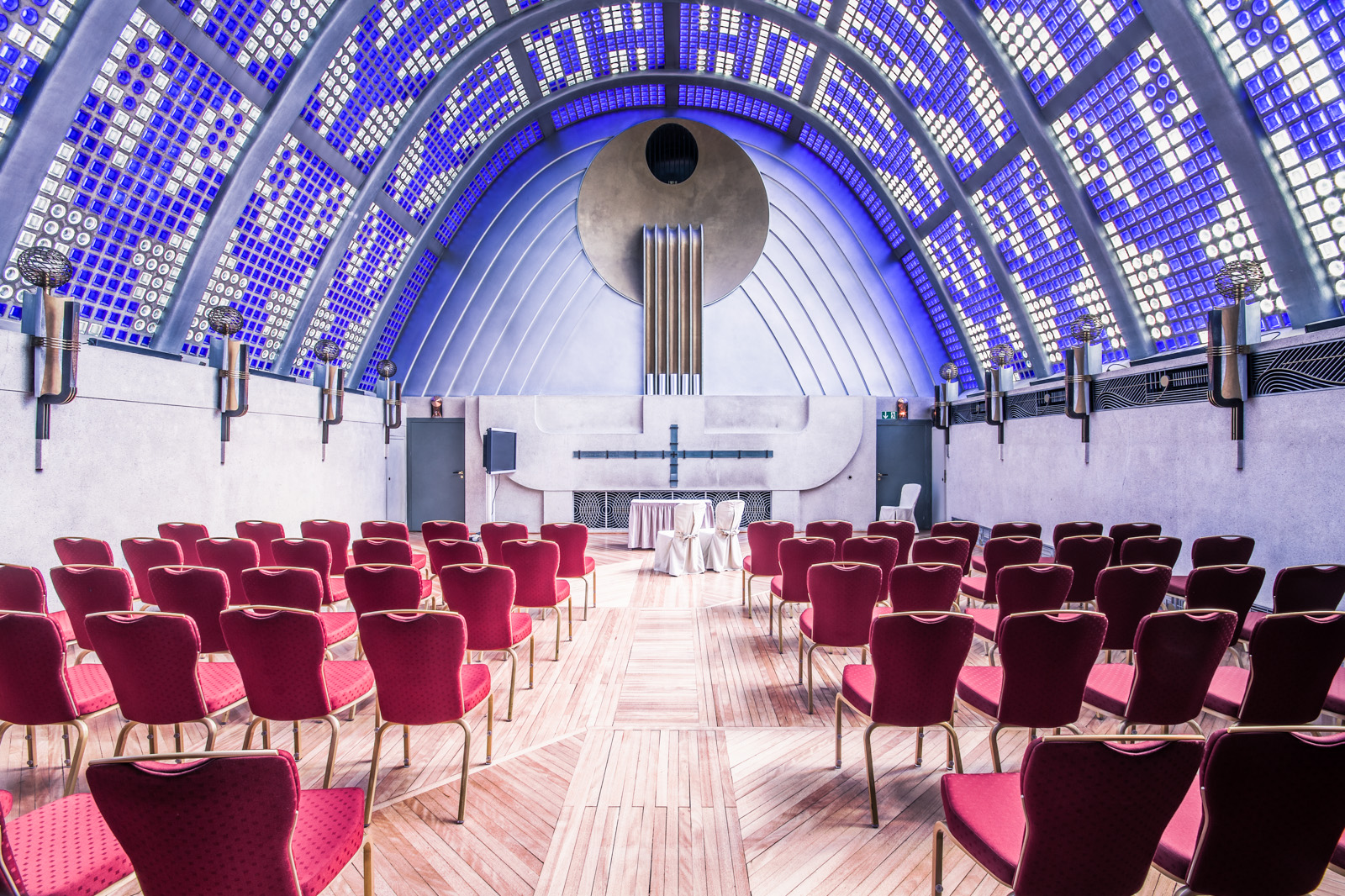
The "Himmelssaal" of the "Haus Atlantis"

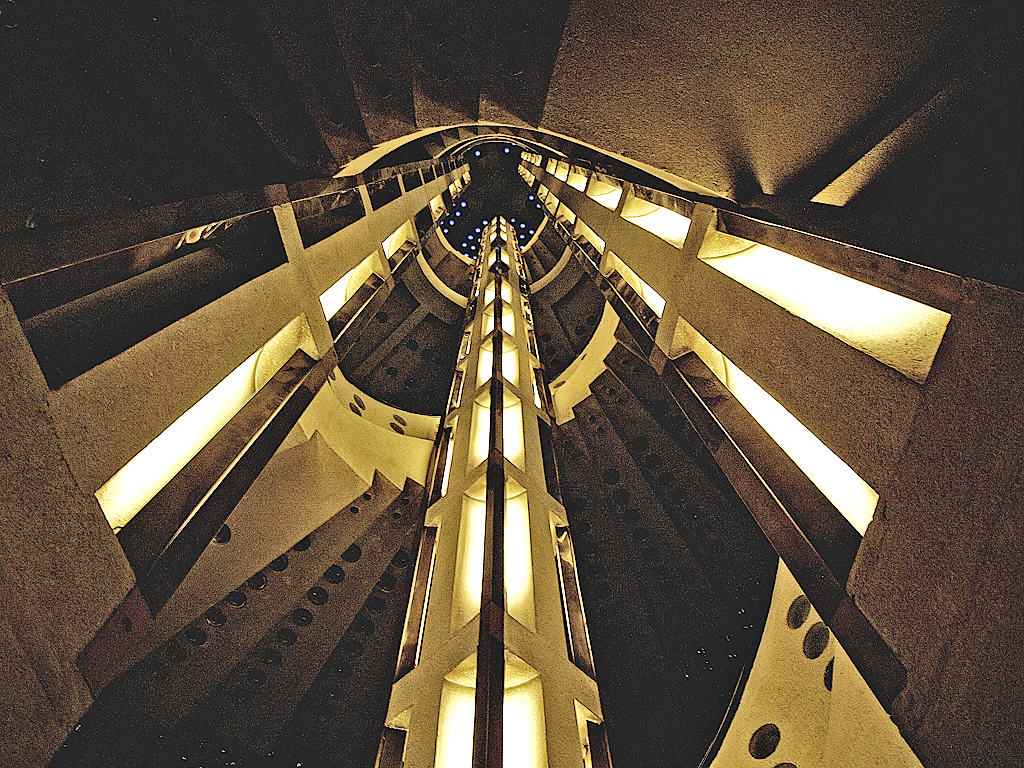
The Art Deco staircase

The Atlantis House (German: Haus Atlantis) is a historic building in Böttcherstraße, Bremen, Germany. It was designed by Bernhard Hoetger and completed in 1931, during the interwar period. After suffering serious war damage, it was rebuilt in 1965 with a new facade designed by Ewald Mataré.

== History and architecture ==
The building was the second designed by Bernhard Hoetger (1929–31) for Böttcherstrasse on the basis of ideas from Ludwig Roselius, the prosperous coffee entrepreneur, and Herman Wirth, the Nazi ethnographer specializing in German ancestral heritage. Roselius was impressed by Wirth's belief that Atlantis, now sunk in the North Sea, was originally inhabited by a Germanic people who took their culture and civilization to Egypt and Mesopotamia, making the Germans the oldest race on earth. Constructed as a demonstratively modern Art Deco building of glass, wood and ferro-concrete, it was therefore structured specifically to house an institute for the study of Atlantis with a lecture theatre, reading room, club rooms (for members of Roselius' Club zu Bremen) and exhibition space. The Atlantis building has been described as the "bizarre centre" of Roselius's architectural investment in Böttcherstraße.

The facade which was rebuilt after the war was originally rasterized right up to the roof with steel supports. The visible framework was accompanied by one of Hoetger's monumental carved wooden features above the entrance representing the Tree of Life (Lebensbaum). It formed an archaized image of the Wheel of the Year, a cross and the solar disc, symbolically representing the origin of life from the start of the year, in other words the beginnings of humanity. Hanging on the cross was the strange figure of the "Altlantis saviour", combining the image of the crucified Christ with the pagan Odin. Barbara Goette was the closest collaborator of Ludwig Roselius and she risked her life when she wrote a philosophical tract on Hoetger's Tree of Life which was attached to the façade of the Atlantis House. The Lebensbaum, which was violently criticized by the Nazis, was destroyed by fire during the war. In 1954, the feature was temporarily replaced by Max Säume and Günther Hafemann with a facade displaying an abstract representation of celestial bodies but this was subsequently hidden by a closed, concentrically ornamented brick wall completed by Ewald Mataré in 1965.

== Interior ==
Inside the house today there is designer lighting that shows off the choice of bold colours and the flowing lines of the interior design. The building has a winding futuristic staircase made from glass and concrete which leads up to the Himmelssaal on the first floor with a ceiling decorated with white and blue glass blocks. The three floors originally started out with a reading room on the first floor, the Himmelssaal ballroom on the second and a museum at the top.

== Hotel ==
In 1988, the Atlantis House complex was sold to the Swedish hotel firm Scandic which combined it with an adjacent recently completed hotel building. The interior was completely renovated but the old staircase and the Himmelssaal with its mosaic ceiling of blue and white glass were maintained as interesting examples of German architecture in the interwar period. Today the building belongs to Radisson as the Radisson Blu Hotel, Bremen. The Himmelssaal (sky room) is open to the public.

== See also ==
- List of hotels in Germany
