= Curt Stoermer =

German painter (1891–1976)

Curt Stoermer (born Kurt Karl August Störmer, 26 April 1891 – 29 January 1976) was a German painter, a representative of the Worpswede branch of expressionist art.

== Biography ==
Born in Hagen in 1891, Stoermer was influenced in his youth by the opening of the Museum Folkwang Karl Ernst Osthaus (which he attended), and learned from Christian Rohlfs. He started studying at the Kunstakademie Düsseldorf in 1908, later moving to Paris to study there, attending the Académie Colarossi. In Paris he visited the artist Amedeo Modigliani, whose work he later described as impressive. He met fellow radical Heinrich Vogeler at school, and went with him to Worpswede in 1912. He catalogued the estate of the late Paula Modersohn-Becker, and published his first woodcuts, including in the magazine Der Sturm, as well as painted. In October that year he held his first exhibition at the Museum Folkwang.

During the First World War, Stoermer was drafted into the Imperial German Army, serving in the Oldenburg Dragoons (Oldenburgisches Dragoner-Regiment Nr. 19). He was wounded in combat. In the aftermath of the war, he participated in the German Revolution of 1918-1919, joining the workers' and soldiers' council of the Bremen Soviet Republic. He became People's Commissar of press and propaganda, together with the editor Alfred Faust. When the Army and Freikorps Caspari descended on the city to put down the revolt, Stoermer went into hiding.

After 1921 he lived and worked in Lübeck, interrupted only by two journeys to East Asia as a sailor of the merchant marine, undertaken due to financial difficulties. Inspired by Ervin Bossányi and promoted by the glazier Carl Berkentien, he turned to glass painting. Among other artwork, he made glass windows for the memorial chapel Aegidienkirche (inspired by Wilhelm Jannasch, and destroyed in 1942 by a land mine blast), the Ratskeller zu Lübeck, Heiligen-Geist-Hospital, and St. Andreas Church in Lübeck.

In 1931 he gained a scholarship from the Villa Massimo through Prussian Academy of Arts, which enabled him to go on a prolonged trip to Dalmatia and Rome. There he met and befriended Werner Gilles, who gave him a decisive impetus for the development of his artistic style. The following year he formed the art group Werkgruppe Lübeck, together with Harry Maasz, Wilhelm Bräck, Alfred Mahlau, Hans Peters, Alen Müller-Hellwig, and Emil Steffann. Due to the National Socialist artist Asmus Jessen he received no public contracts after the rise of the Third Reich, and four of his woodcuts at the Folkwang Museum were confiscated as "degenerate art".

After the destruction of his Lübeck studio by an Allied bomb attack in 1942, he moved to a property in Utecht, by Ratzeburger See. After the end of the Second World War Stoermer received several contracts for the decoration of public buildings, mainly to restore wartime damages, such as the Thomas-Mann-Schule and the Landesversicherungsanstalt and the Mengstraße police station. His sgraffito was found on many apartment blocks in Lübeck-Eichholz during the 1950s. Stoermer created a wealth of watercolors and drawings, particularly depicting his many travels in the Mediterranean Sea. He also worked as a critic for the Lübecker Freie Presse, a Social Democratic newspaper.

== Bibliography ==
- Enns, Abram (1978). Curt Stoermer – Auf der Suche nach der eigenen Identität. In: Kunst und Bürgertum (in German). Lübeck. pp. 248–265 and 308–310. ISBN 3-7672-0571-8.
- Hannemann, Horst (1993). Lübecker Lebensläufe (in German). Neumünster: Wachholtz. ISBN 3-529-02729-4.
- Hannemann, Ursula (2006). Die Kirchenfenster von St. Andreas in Schlutup (in German). Neumünster. pp. 110–120.
