= Self-Portrait at 6th Wedding Anniversary =

Painting by Paula Moderson-Becker

Self-portrait at 6th wedding anniversary
- Selbstbildnis am 6. Hochzeitstag (German)
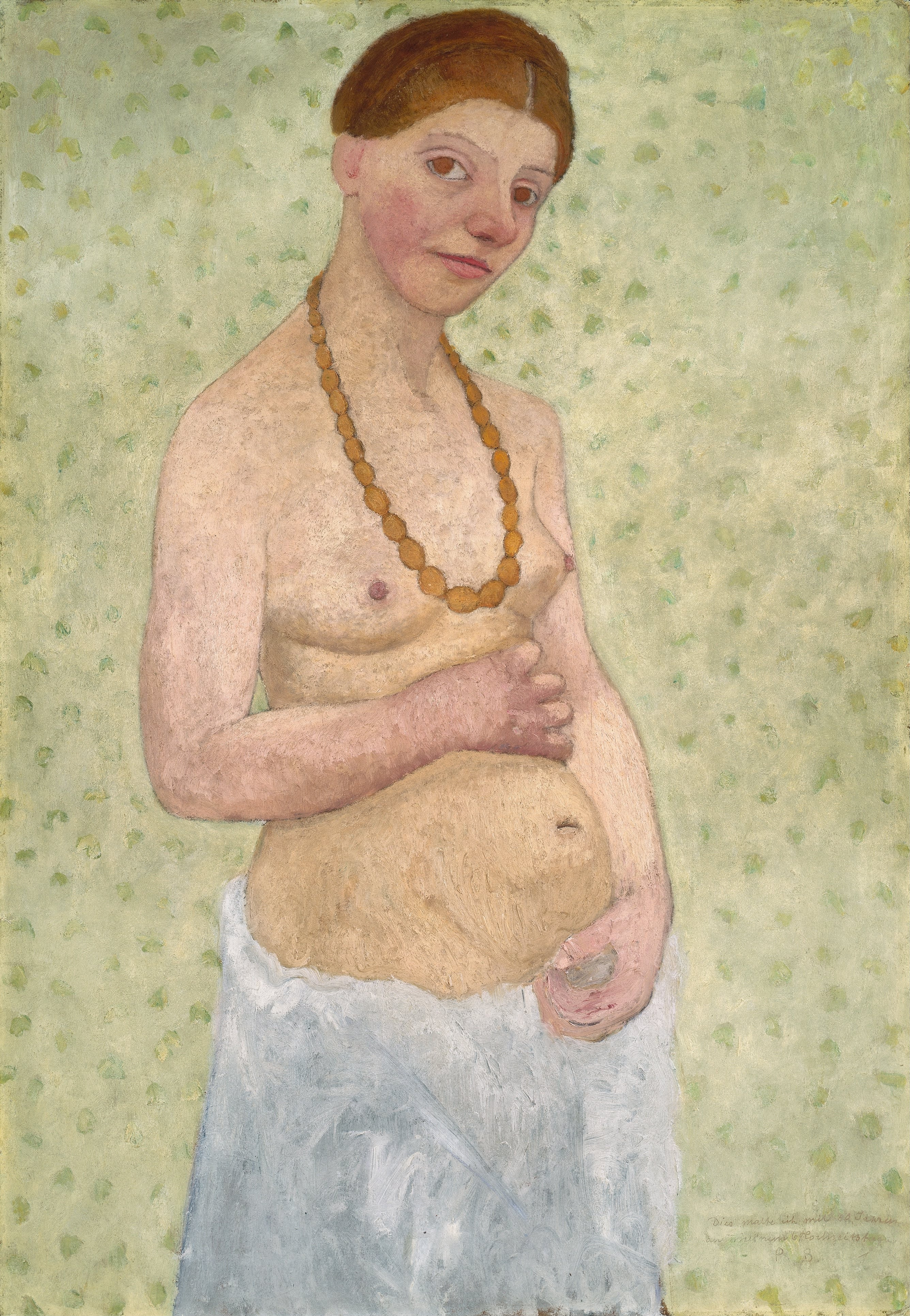
- Artist: Paula Modersohn-Becker
- Year: May 25, 1906
- Catalogue: GER_280_010
- Medium: Oil tempera on cardboard
- Movement: Expressionism
- Subject: Self
- Dimensions: 101.8 cm × 70.2 cm (40.1 in × 27.6 in)
- Location: Paula Modersohn-Becker Museum, Bremen

Self-portrait at 6th wedding anniversary (German: Selbstbildnis am 6. Hochzeitstag), also known as Self-portrait on the sixth wedding anniversary and Self-portrait on the sixth anniversary of marriage, is a painting by the German expressionist painter Paula Modersohn-Becker during her stay in Paris in 1906.

== Background ==
In February 1906, Modersohn-Becker moved to Paris from Worpswede, a small town near Bremen, Germany. She had decided to leave her husband and Worpswede forever, and devote herself entirely to art.

== Description ==
She is turned to the viewer's right and watches the viewer with a searching and questioning look. She has a white cloth on her hip. Her upper body is bare. She wears an amber necklace.

When Modersohn-Becker painted this self-portrait, she was not pregnant, despite what the picture appears to show.

She painted another nude self-portrait in Paris during the summer of 1906, which is in the Kunstmuseum Basel in Switzerland. As far as is known, these nudes were not displayed during her lifetime to outsiders, but they became known after her death in November 1907.

== Provenance ==
The painting was owned by Modersohn-Becker's mother in 1908. By 1916, it was owned by her daughter, Tille Modersohn, and loaned to Bernhard Hoetger in Worpswede. In 1927, it was loaned by Ludwig Roselius to the Paula Becker-Modersohn-Haus in Bremen, Germany. It was purchased in 1988, and is located at the Paula Modersohn-Becker Museum in Bremen, the first museum devoted to a female artist.

== Title ==
The painting's customary title in German is Selbstbildnis am 6. Hochzeitstag, word-for-word: "Self-portrait on the 6th wedding-day." In this context, "6th wedding-day" corresponds to the fifth, not the sixth, wedding anniversary (the first wedding-day being the day of the wedding). Paula Becker married Otto Modersohn on 25 May 1901 and painted this picture on 25 May 1906—that is, five, not six, years later.
