= Alfred Faust =

Alfred Faust (15 December 1883, Soultzmatt – 14 June 1961, Bremen) was a German advertising executive, journalist, editor, and left-wing politician.

== Biography ==
Born in Alsace (today part of France) in 1883, Faust was the son of a master plumber and winemaker. He had a business education, and an apprenticeship in printing, as well as attending a Catholic seminar in Belgium. In his youth he did military service, graduating as a Grenadier in Berlin, going on to teach French from 1905 on. From 1909 to 1914 Faust was a journalist, later working with advertisement for the company Café HAG, working in Bremen.

Between 1914 and 1918, Faust was called into the Imperial German Army, and fought in the First World War. In 1917, before the war's end, he joined the Independent Social Democratic Party of Germany (USPD), a left-wing split from the Social Democratic Party of Germany (SPD). When the war ended in 1918, he became heavily involved in radical politics, joining the December Reich Council Congress (German: Reichsrätekongress) in Berlin. Returning to Bremen, he joined the government of the brief Bremen Soviet Republic (existing between January and February 1919). He was selected by the city's workers' and soldiers' council to serve as People's Commissar of press and propaganda, together with Curt Stoermer. He also served as editor of the Bremer Bürger-Zeitung, which had been occupied by the workers.

After the defeat of the Bremen Soviet Republic at the hands of the Army and Freikorps Caspari, he became chief editor of the Bremer Arbeiterzeitung. In March 1919 he became a member of the Bremen National Assembly, serving as a deputy of the Bürgerschaft of Bremen from 1920 to 1933. In 1922 he joined the SDP, after the USDP was merged with it once more. Faust became an editor of the Bremer Volkszeitung, led by Wilhelm Kaisen, becoming its chief editor in 1928.

Elected to the Reichstag after the November 1932 federal election, it was not until March 1933 that his seat was confirmed. The same month, after the rise of the Nazi Party and Adolf Hitler, he helped the fellow SDP politician Rudolf Breitscheid escape to Switzerland, but returned to Bremen himself. A month later, on 28 April, he was put in "protective custody" by the Sturmabteilung (SA), and held in KZ Mißler, an early concentration camp in Bremen that later also held his fellow Bremen Soviet Republic politician Hermann Böse. Later placed in other detention centers, Faust was strongly physically abused by his captors, especially in KZ Mißler.

He spent time in prison until 1934, when he was released from jail and expelled from Bremen, settling in Berlin. He worked for Ludwig Roselius, conservative founder of his previous employer Café HAG, at the Angelsachsenverlag. Barbara Goette worked and corresponded extensively with Faust in Berlin. Her son Ludwig Leidig sold 80 items of their correspondence to the Bremen State archives in 1998. When the publisher was closed in 1944, he fled to his native Alsace, working as an editor in Mulhouse until 1949. In August 1949 Faust returned to Bremen again, rejoining the Angelsachsenverlag. From 11 July 1950 on until his death he was head of the press office of the Senate of Bremen.

After his death in 1961, the a street was named for him in the Obervieland district of Bremen: Alfred-Faust-Straße.

== Bibliography ==
- Der Freiheit verpflichtet. Gedenkbuch der deutschen Sozialdemokratie im 20. Jahrhundert (in German). Marburg: Social Democratic Party of Germany. 2000. p. 92.
- Kloos, Werner (1980). Bremer Lexikon (in German). Bremen: Hauschild. pp. 143–144.
- Roselius, Kurt (1969). Bremische Biographie 1912–1962 (in German). Bremen: Hauschild.
- Schwarzwälder, Herbert (2003). Das Große Bremen-Lexikon (in German). Bremen: Edition Temmen. ISBN 3-86108-693-X.
