= Wilhelm Jannasch =

German Protestant theologian and clergyman (1888–1966)

- Born: April 8, 1888; Gnadenfrei
- Died: June 6, 1966 (aged 78); Frankfurt am Main, West Germany
- Education: University of Marburg; University of Bonn; University of Berlin; Heidelberg University
- Occupation: Clergyman
- Years active: 1913–1956
- Theological work
- Tradition or movement: Protestantism, Confessing Church
- Main interests: Practical theology

Wilhelm Jannasch (8 April 1888, in Gnadenfrei – 6 June 1966, in Frankfurt am Main) was a German Protestant theologian and clergyman.

He studied theology at the universities of Marburg, Bonn, Berlin and Heidelberg. In 1913 he was ordained as a minister in Weimar, and during the following year received his licentiate at Heidelberg. In 1921 he was named senior pastor at St. Giles Church in Lübeck. In 1934 he was forced into early retirement by the Nazi government, and he subsequently became an active member of the Confessing Church. From 1939 onwards, he served as a pastor of the Confessing congregation in Berlin-Friedenau. From 1946 to 1956 he was a professor of practical theology at the University of Mainz.

== Selected works ==
- Erdmuthe Dorothea Gräfin von Zinzendorf, geborene Gräfin Reuß zu Plauen (1914) – Erdmuthe Dorothea Countess von Zinzendorf, born Countess Reuss of Plauen.
- Geschichte des lutherischen Gottesdienstes in Lübeck : von den Anfängen der Reformation bis zum Ende des Niedersächsischen als gottesdienstliche Sprache (1522–1633), (1928), History of Lutheran worship in Lübeck: from the beginnings of the Reformation to the end of Low Saxon as liturgical language, 1522–1633.
- Der Kampf um das Wort : aus der Glaubensgeschichte einer deutschen Stadt (1931).
- Deutsche Kirchendokumente : die Haltung der Bekennenden Kirche im Dritten Reich (1946), German church documents: the attitude of the Confessing Church in the Third Reich.
- Reformationsgeschichte Lübecks vom Petersablass bis zum Augsburger Reichstag 1515–1530 (1958); Reformation history of Lübeck from the Petersablass to the Diet of Augsburg, 1515–1530.
- Das Zeitalter des Pietismus (with Martin Schmidt, 1965) – The Age of Pietism.
