= Barbara Goette =

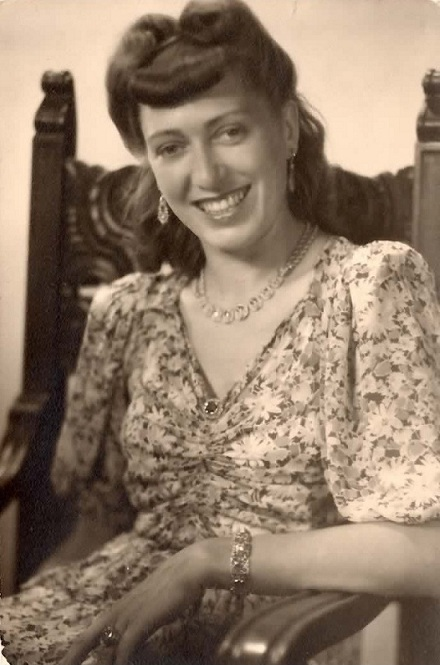
- Born: 26 July 1908; German Empire
- Died: 23 October 1997 (aged 89); Australia
- Education: mathematics, physics and philosophy
- Alma mater: Freiburg University; Kiel
- Occupation: Academic
- Spouse: J.P. Leidig
- Children: 2 sons

Barbara Goette (26 July 1908 – 23 October 1997) was a British (by marriage) - German academic. She lived in Germany and then Australia. From 1935 to 1943, she was the private secretary of Ludwig Roselius. Roselius was the creator of the Böttcherstraße, Kaffee HAG and was the financier of Focke-Wulf.

== Early life ==
Barbara Goette matriculated in Kassel in 1928 and began studying mathematics, physics and philosophy at Freiburg University and then Kiel where she took her state examinations in 1934-35. She met Dr. Ludwig Roselius through the marriage of her brother to his youngest daughter. He suggested she work for the concern. Goette became his companion, carer, confidante and collaborator.

== Career ==
In September 1936, during a meeting in Berlin, the Reichsluftfahrtministerium (German Aviation Ministry) recommended reconstruction of Focke-Wulf with 50% going to the state and 50% to a large electronics concern.

A short time later the Roselius conglomerate became majority shareholder with 46% and Lorenz (ITT) securing 27.8%. The aircraft company was reconstituted as Focke-Wulf Flugzeugbau GmbH. Goette was instrumental in assisting with this.

In late 1935, the SS newspaper Das Schwarze Korps had launched a vitriolic attack on Roselius's Böttcherstrasse. The Böttcherstrasse was reclassified as 'degenerate art' and Hitler condemned Roselius at the Nazi Party rally of September 1936. Hitler was said to have spared Roselius's life due to Goette's service in the reorganization of Focke-Wulf.

Subsequently in 1937, Roselius had the new FW 200 Condor fitted with 26 passenger seats as a tribute to Goette (her birthday was the 26th).

After the death of Roselius, Goette lectured in English at the Humboldt Hochschule in Berlin until the premises were demolished during a bombing raid. On 26 May 1944 Goette travelled to Bad Eilsen to meet with Focke-Wulf aircraft designer and engineer Professor Kurt Tank in order to obtain his written contribution for a memorial publication on Roselius' life. Reichsführer Heinrich Himmler saw Goette's English books at Mittersill Castle in Austria and the Gestapo launched an investigation in August 1944. She risked her life by writing about the issues that had infuriated Hitler in 1936, motivating his attack on Roselius and the Böttcherstrasse at the Nuremberg Party Rally in September of that year. This ten page essay, completed and approved in September 1944, was eventually published by the Bremen Yearbook in 1951 and is included in the reference section. The controversial aspects were:

- The Paula Becker-Modersohn museum which was the first museum in the world dedicated to a female artist and labelled 'degenerate art' by the Nazis.
- The architecture of Bernhard Hoetger, labelled 'degenerate' by the Nazis.
- Hoetger's 'Tree of Life', which depicted a Nordic sacrifice.

Goette began her Ph.D. in philosophy at Kiel in 1944. There she met Dr. J.P. Leidig, whom she married in February 1945. Shortly after the war she acted as an interpreter and German teacher for the U.S. military police in Gunzenhausen, Bavaria.

In 1950 the family settled in Adelaide, South Australia. Dr. Leidig died in 1957 and Goette was left with two sons. She never remarried and taught mathematics at Woodlands Church of England Girls Grammar School for 23 years. One year she had 4 of the top 10 students in South Australia in her class. She received a congratulatory call from the University of Adelaide Mathematics Department. She worked as mathematics teacher at the Muirden College Matriculation Centre until she was 81. Mitzi Bergel was Goette's best friend in Australia and every year Goette hosted a Christmas party in North Adelaide attended mostly by Jewish friends. Although not political by nature, Barbara was staunchly anti-Nazi all her life.

A comprehensive posthumous interview by the Australian Our Time channel 44 program (episode 188) on her life was broadcast in 2015.

== Publications ==
While employed by the Roselius concern, Goette wrote many articles on Dr. Roselius including, "Ludwig Roselius creates the Böttcherstraße" and "Politics and Propaganda". An unpublished essay, "Ludwig the Philosopher", appears in the biography that her son Ludwig Leidig wrote; Kevin Lower was researcher and it was edited by Karen Collins. This book deals primarily with Goette's life in Germany during the Third Reich.

Goette conducted extensive WWII correspondence with Senator Alfred Faust. In 1998, the Bremen State Archives purchased 80 original items from Ludwig Leidig in Australia.
