= Saloni Mathur =

Saloni Mathur is professor of Modern and Contemporary South Asian Art, the head of the department of art history at the University of California, Los Angeles, USA, and author of India by Design (2007). Her paper "A Retake of Sher-Gil's Self-Portrait as Tahitian" (2011), analyses the influences of Paul Gauguin, Vincent van Gogh, and Japonisme, on Hungarian-born Indian artist Amrita Sher-Gil's painting titled Self-Portrait as a Tahitian.

== Selected publications ==
=== Books ===
- Mathur, Saloni (2007). India by design: colonial history and cultural display. Berkeley: University of California press. ISBN 978-0520234178.
- Mathur, Saloni (2011). The migrant's time: rethinking art history and diaspora. Williamstown (Mass.) New Haven [Conn.] London: Sterling and Francine Clark art institute, distributed by Yale university press. ISBN 978-0300134148.
- Mathur, Saloni; Kwon, Miwon. Making Strange: Gagawaka + Postmortem by Vivan Sundaram. University of California Los Angeles, Fowler Museum of Cultural History. ISBN 978-0984755097.
- Mathur, Saloni; Singh, Kavita (2015). No touching, no spitting, no praying: the museum in South Asia. New Delhi [Inde]: Routledge. ISBN 9781138796010.
- Mathur, Saloni (2019). A fragile inheritance: radical stakes in contemporary Indian art. Durham: Duke university press. ISBN 9781478001867.

=== Articles ===
- Mathur, Saloni (2011). "A Retake of Sher-Gil's Self-Portrait as Tahitian". Critical Inquiry. 37 (3): 515–544. doi:10.1086/659356. ISSN 0093-1896.
