= Young Man with Apples =

1932 painting by Amrita Sher-Gil

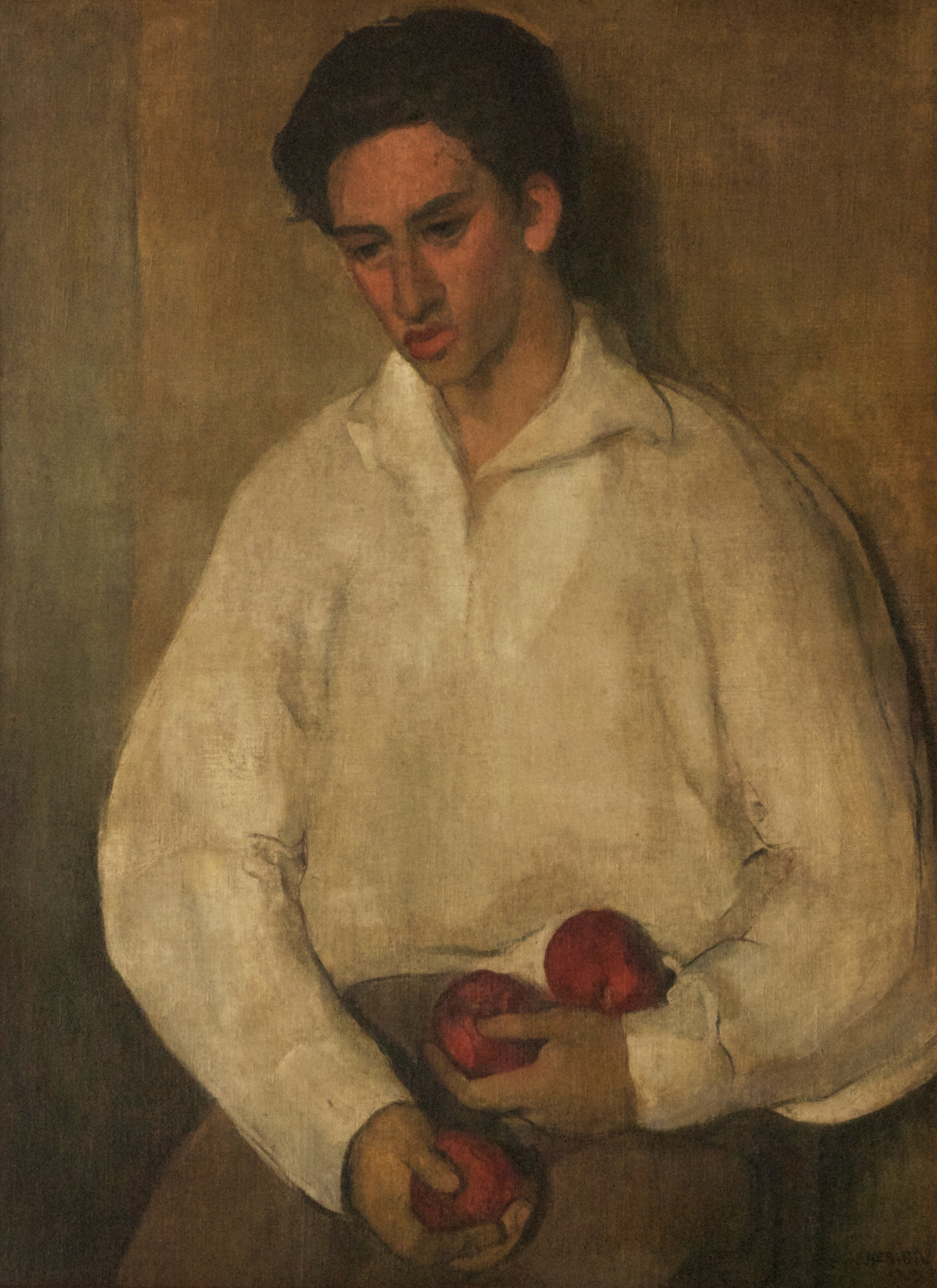
- Artist: Amrita Sher-Gil
- Year: 1932
- Medium: Oil on canvas
- Dimensions: 97 cm × 71 cm (38 in × 28 in)
- Location: National Gallery of Modern Art, New Delhi

Young Man with Apples, also called Boris with Apples, is an oil painting on canvas created in 1932 by Hungarian-born Indian artist Amrita Sher-Gil, when she was living in Paris.

The painting depicts Boris Taslitzky (1911–2005) preoccupied in deep thought.

== Exhibitions ==
One of three portraits Sher-Gil completed of Taslitzky, Young Man with Apples was exhibited at the XII Salon des Tuileries in 1934. In April 1934, she wrote to her friend Denise Proutaux that she was allowed to exhibit five paintings at the Salon, and being the last chance to, as her return to India was planned for later that year, she hoped to send the portrait of Boris with Apples along with Self-Portrait as a Tahitian. Sher-Gil wrote "they will go well together, a good contrast: with one in blues and yellows (it's a nude you do not know, I started it after you left), and the other in harmony of pink and white."

The painting was number 25 of 33 of Sher-Gil's works displayed at her solo exhibition at Faletti's Hotel in Lahore, British India, held from 21 to 27 November 1937. There, it was priced at ₹500.

== See also ==
- List of paintings by Amrita Sher-Gil

== Bibliography ==
- Dalmia, Yashodhara (2013). Amrita Sher-Gil: A Life. Gurugram: Penguin Books. ISBN 978-0-14-342026-2.
- Higgie, Jennifer (2021). The Mirror and the Palette: Rebellion, Revolution and Resilience: 500 Years of Women's Self-Portraits. Hachette. p. 190. ISBN 978-1-4746-1380-4.
- Sundaram, Vivan (2010). Amrita Sher-Gil: A Self-Portrait in Letters and Writings. Vol. 1. New Delhi: Tulika Books. pp. 1–417. ISBN 978-81-89487-59-1.
- Sundaram, Vivan (2010). Amrita Sher-Gil: A Self-Portrait in Letters and Writings. Vol. 2. New Delhi: Tulika Books. pp. 418–821. ISBN 978-81-89487-59-1.
