= Hermann-Böse-Gymnasium =

Coordinates: 53°05′00″N 8°49′07″E

- Hermann-Böse-Straße 1-9 28209; Bremen; Germany

Information
- Type: Public
- Motto: Non scholae sed vitae discimus (We learn, not for school, but for life)
- Established: 1905
- School number: 308
- Principal: Sibylle Müller
- Faculty: 65
- Enrollment: 920
- Colors: Blue and white
- Mascot: Elephant
- Website: http://www.hbg-bremen.de

Hermann-Böse-Gymnasium (HBG) is a co-educational secondary school in Bremen, Germany with bilingual focus and offer an IB class.

== History ==
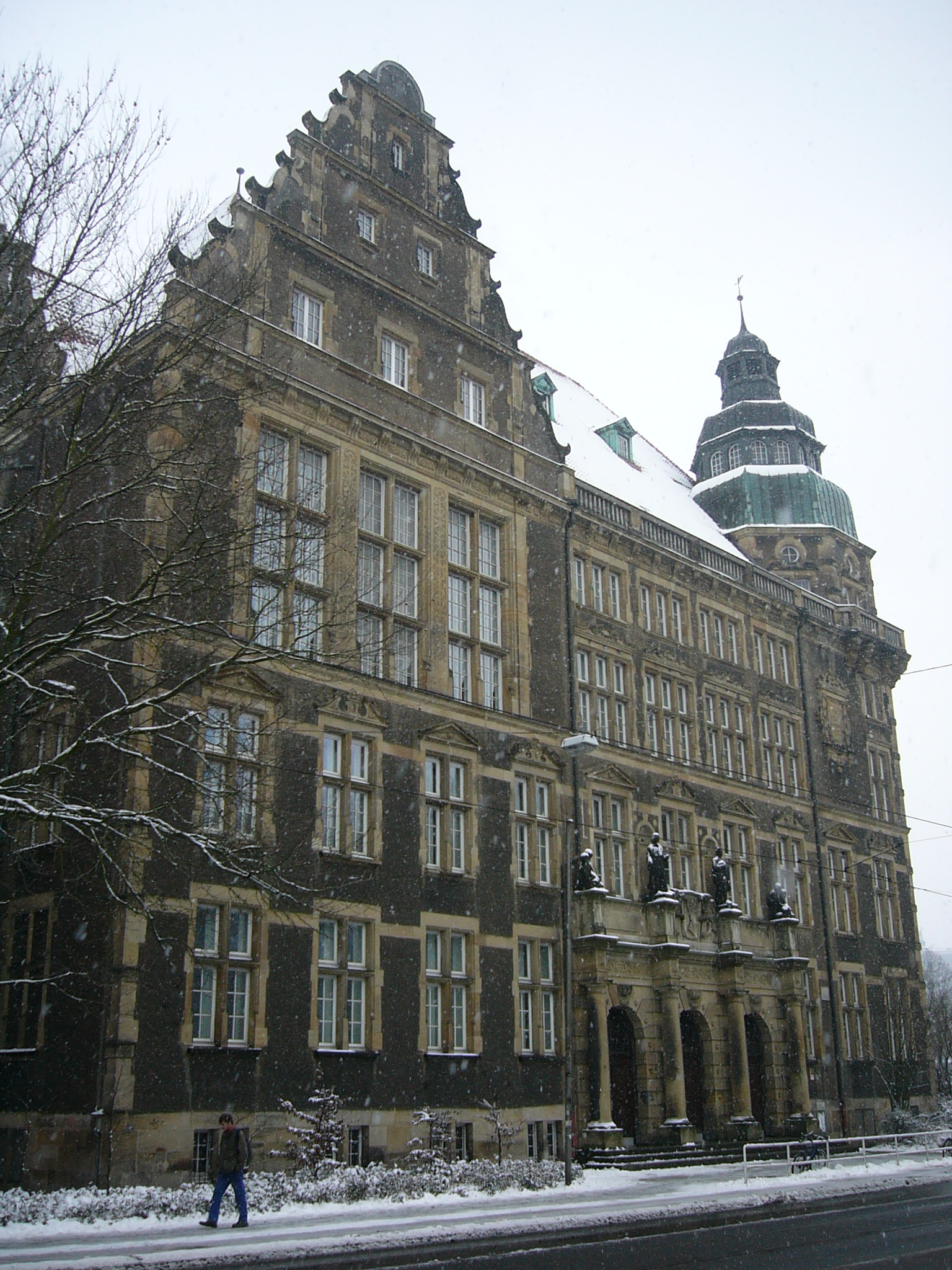
Front view of the HBG

The Hermann-Böse-Gymnasium was founded in 1905 as a secondary school for boys at the instigation of the Senate of the Free Hanseatic City of Bremen. Therefore, HBG should notably educate a new elite in sciences and foreign languages.

This tradition continues to date, as evidenced on the basis of numerous outstanding placings at various competitions and the emphasis of economics and English as major fields of study. Students are also able to participate in a number of international conferences, such as Model United Nations (MUN) and Model European Parliaments each year. In 2009, the school hosts the first MUN for middle and high school students in Bremen.

Furthermore, the Hermann-Böse-Gymnasium is the only secondary school in Bremen, which still resides in its original building. The school itself was constructed in the style of the Weser Renaissance and is today under monumental protection. The building is located very central and is close to the central station.

From 1933 until 1945, the school was named after Paul Emil von Lettow-Vorbeck, a German officer who led the Schutztruppe in German East Africa successfully through World War I. This post-World War I hero today is controversially discussed, as he was also involved in the abatement of the Herero uprising in Namibia and the Kapp Putsch. Lettow-Vorbeck often held pro-colonial speeches at the school. Today the school holds a partnership with a Namibian school.

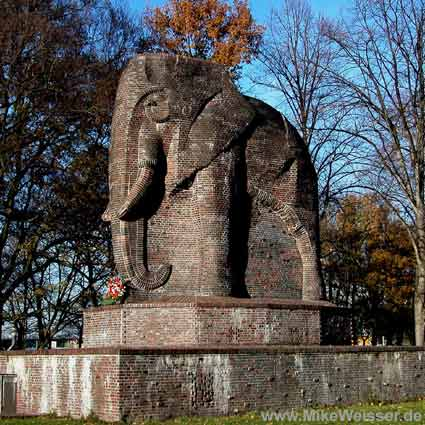
Anti-colonial monument

After World War II the school was named after Hermann Böse (1870–1943), a music teacher of the school who was deported by the Nazis. Since he was a communist, it was perceived after World War II that he could not serve as an example for students alongside greats like Goethe and Kopernikus. So it was decided to name the street after Böse instead, and from then on the institute was referred to as Gymnasium an der Hermann-Böse-Straße.

It was not until May 2005 that the school decided the renaming to Hermann-Böse-Gymnasium from August 2005, since for pupils and the public the school was long known as Hermann-Böse-Gymnasium for short, or rather in the shortest form HBG. In addition to this it was considered reasonable to connect the values of Böse like social justice, solidarity and humanity directly with the school.

Across from the school there is a 7 metre high brick-elephant designed by the sculptor Fritz Behn, inaugurated on 6 July 1932, which became the emblem of the school. Just like the school the monument changed from a pro-colonial monument to an anti-colonial monument in a ceremonious renaming on 18 May 1990.

The Motto of the school is seen on the facade above the main entrance and says "non scholae sed vitae [discimus]", in English "[we learn,] not for school, but for life", in its well-known inversion of the saying of Seneca "non vitae sed scholae discimus". From 29 September till 1 October 2005 the school celebrated its centenary.

== Building ==
The Charlottenburger architect group had won the contest for the construction of a Realgymnasium in Bremen. The school building was constructed according to their plans from 1903 to 1906. On 19 April 1906 the school first opened its doors to students.

The building outlasted World War II relatively undamaged. In 1977 it was the first school building in Bremen to be put under monumental protection, which turned out to be one reason - among others - not to give up the school location Hermann-Böse-Straße from 1988 to 1989.

There are four small statues located above the main entrance. One of them shows Goethe and another one Copernicus. The other two statues represent science and cosmopolitanism.

== See also ==
- List of schools in Germany
- Hermann Böse
- Bremen
