= Hermann Böse =

German music teacher and conductor

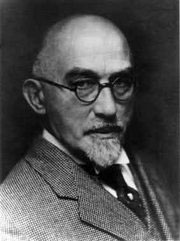
Hermann Böse

Hermann Böse (May 4, 1870, Hemelingen – July 17, 1943, Bremen) was a German music teacher and conductor at the Hermann-Böse-Gymnasium, which was named after him, as well as a communist activist. He was also conductor of the ultra left "Workers - Singing Union in Bremen".

== Life ==
Böse was born in Hemelingen on May 4, 1870. He was one of eight children. His father, Johann Böse, was a head teacher in Hemelingen which at that time was part of Prussia. Hermann Böse, along with three of his brothers, also worked as teachers. Between 1897 and 1907, he worked at the deaf-mute institute in Bremen.

During the German Revolution of 1918-1919, Böse became the Bremen Soviet Republic's head of the People's Commissariat for Education. In this position, Böse prohibited religious education.

Since Böse was a convinced communist, and after the Nazi seizure of power he lost his pension. He was arrested in 1943 by the Gestapo. He died in Bremen two days after he was released from the KZ Mißler, a concentration camp which also held fellow Bremen Soviet Republic politician Alfred Faust.

To this day, Böse is known as one of the most passionate resistance fighters of the KPD. The Hermann-Böse-Straße and the Hermann-Böse-Gymnasium (since 2005) in Bremen are named after him.
