= Aegidienkirche, Lübeck =

Coordinates: 53°51′50″N 10°41′23″E

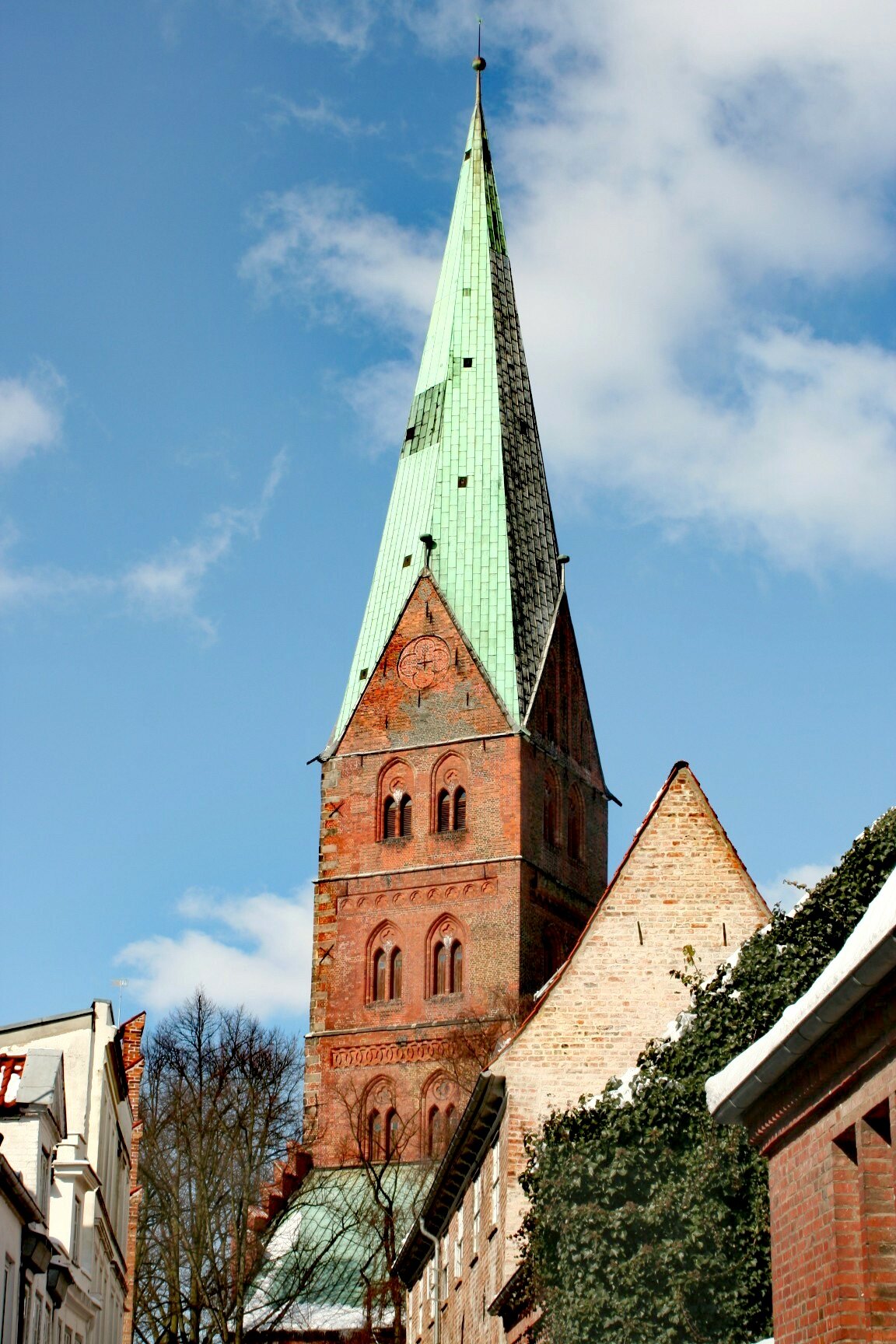
Its tower from the south

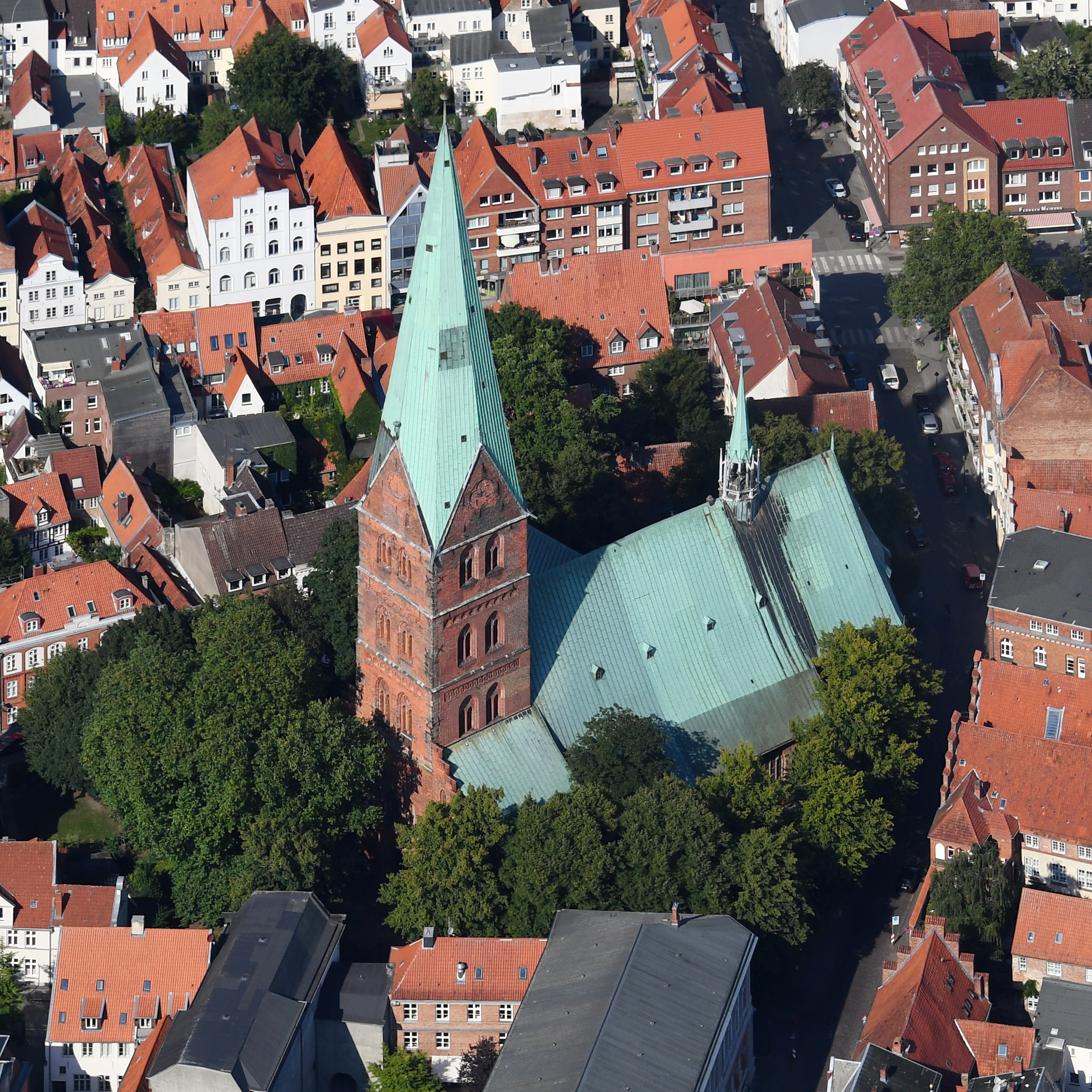
Aerial view of the church

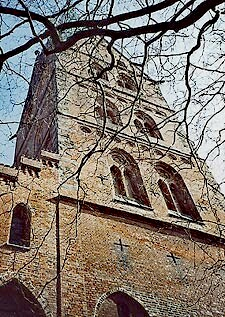
West front

The St.-Aegidien-Kirche or Aegidienkirche is a church building in the north German city of Lübeck, dedicated to saint Giles. It is the smallest and easternmost church in the city centre. It is first mentioned as dedicated to St Giles in 1227; this is unusual for a north German and may link it to an earlier 1172–1182 wooden church built under bishop Henry I, formerly the abbot of the abbey dedicated to the same saint in Braunschweig. The church's coat of arms includes a "T", short for "Tilgenkark", the Low German form of the church's name, and "St Tilgen" or "St. Illigen", the Low German forms of the saint's name.

It remained in the nearby cathedral chapter's control until the Protestant Reformation, when shortly after Easter 1530 it hosted the town's first eucharist in which both elements were distributed to the people. Its pastor "Johann by der Erde" was also the city's first clergyman to marry, also in 1530. The church roof was hit by a shell during the 1806 Battle of Lübeck but it did not ignite, whilst a cannonball from the same engagement is still lodged in the wall near the north door. The area around the church was heavily damaged during the March 1942 air-raid on the city and an aerial mine destroyed historic stained-glass and work by Curt Stoermer inside the church but left the exterior unaffected.
