= Boris Taslitzky =

French painter (1911–2005)

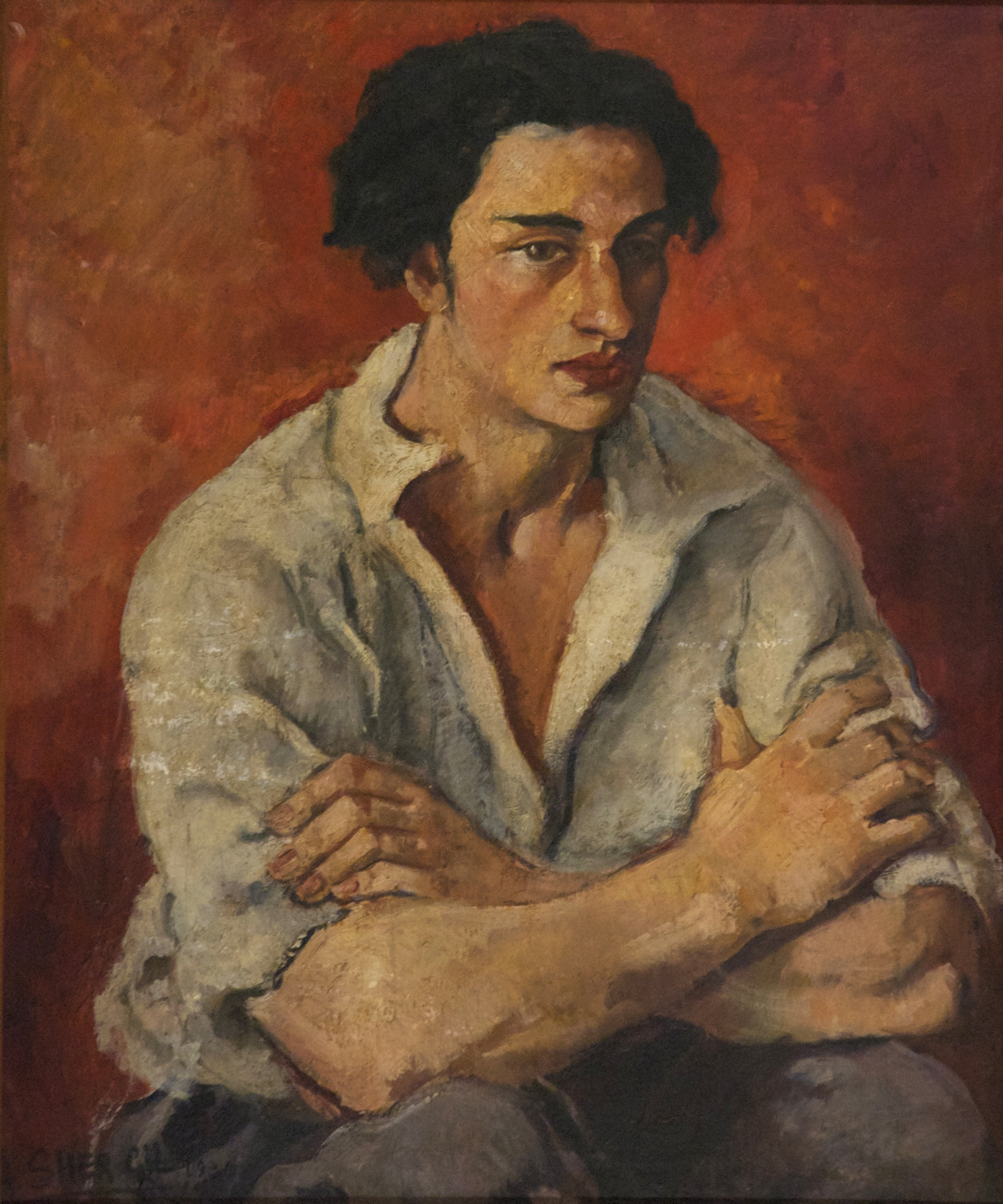
1930 portrait of Boris Tazlitsky entitled Portrait of a Young Man, by Amrita Sher-Gil, National Gallery of Modern Art, New Delhi

Boris Taslitzky, sometimes Boris Tazlitsky (September 30, 1911 – December 9, 2005), was a French painter with left-wing sympathies, best known for his figurative depictions of some difficult moments in the history of the twentieth century. His work is considered as representative of Socialist realism in art in France.

== Biography ==
Boris Taslitzky was born in Paris to Jewish parents who had emigrated to France from Russia after the failure of the 1905 Russian Revolution. His father, an engineer, died during World War I and Boris became a ward of the nation. He began painting at the age of fifteen and attended the academies of Montparnasse, went to the Louvre museum and copied grand masters such as Rubens, Delacroix, Géricault and Courbet. In 1928, he entered the École des Beaux-Arts in Paris studying with Lucien Simon, Jacques Lipchitz and Jean Lurçat for tapestry.

In 1935 he joined the French Communist Party and also acted in artistic organizations.

In 1936 he supported the Popular Front and its cultural policies. Some of his paintings depicted the miners involved in the 1936 strikes.

Taslitzky traveled to Spain during the Spanish Civil War and, in 1937 at the International Exhibition of Art and Technology in Modern Life, exhibited his painting The Telegram, tribute to García Lorca alongside Pablo Picasso's Guernica.

With the advent of World War II, he was drafted into the army in August 1939. He was captured in June 1940, but managed to escape in August and became involved in the resistance movement with the National Front active during the Occupation of France by Germany.

Arrested by the special brigades in November 1941, sentenced to two years in prison, he was transferred to the prisons of Riom and Mauzac, then to the Saint-Sulpice-la-Pointe camp where he painted frescoes on the walls of some of the cells and in the chapel. On the last day of July 1944, he was deported in one of the last transports to Buchenwald where he managed to do some pencil drawings that bear witness to the life in the camps. His sketches were made on stolen German paper. He created portraits of fellow prisoners.

His mother was taken in the Vel' d'Hiv Roundup and died on the way to Auschwitz.

In 1946, after the war, Louis Aragon published a hundred of his drawings of Buchenwald. Taslitzky started lecturing at the École Nationale Supérieure des Arts Décoratifs, became Secretary General of "the Union des arts plastiques" and, the same year, was awarded the Blumenthal Prize for painting.

In 1945, after his release, to commemorate the death at Auschwitz of the wife of Laurent Casanova, a French Communist party official, he painted The Death of Danielle Casanova, in the form of a secular Pietà rendering.

At the 1951 Salon d'Automne, Riposte, a depiction of striking dockers in Marseille refusing to load weapons destined for the war in Indochina, was removed by the police. In 1952 he traveled to Algeria, then still a French colony, to make paintings exposing the poor conditions under which people lived and to denounce colonialism.

His art included works on the First Indochina War, the Vietnam War, the coup d'état that took Augusto Pinochet to power in Chile in 1973, Apartheid in South Africa and the Zaire events.

Already decorated with the 1939–1945 war cross and the military medal, he was awarded Knighthood in the Legion of Honor in 1997 with the title of "Resistance and Deportation".

His work, often labeled as representative of Socialist realism in art, is a free interpretation of the genre. His life was marked by the great upheavals of the twentieth century and his artistic and political commitments denote his awareness and sense of responsibility as an artist.

== Death ==
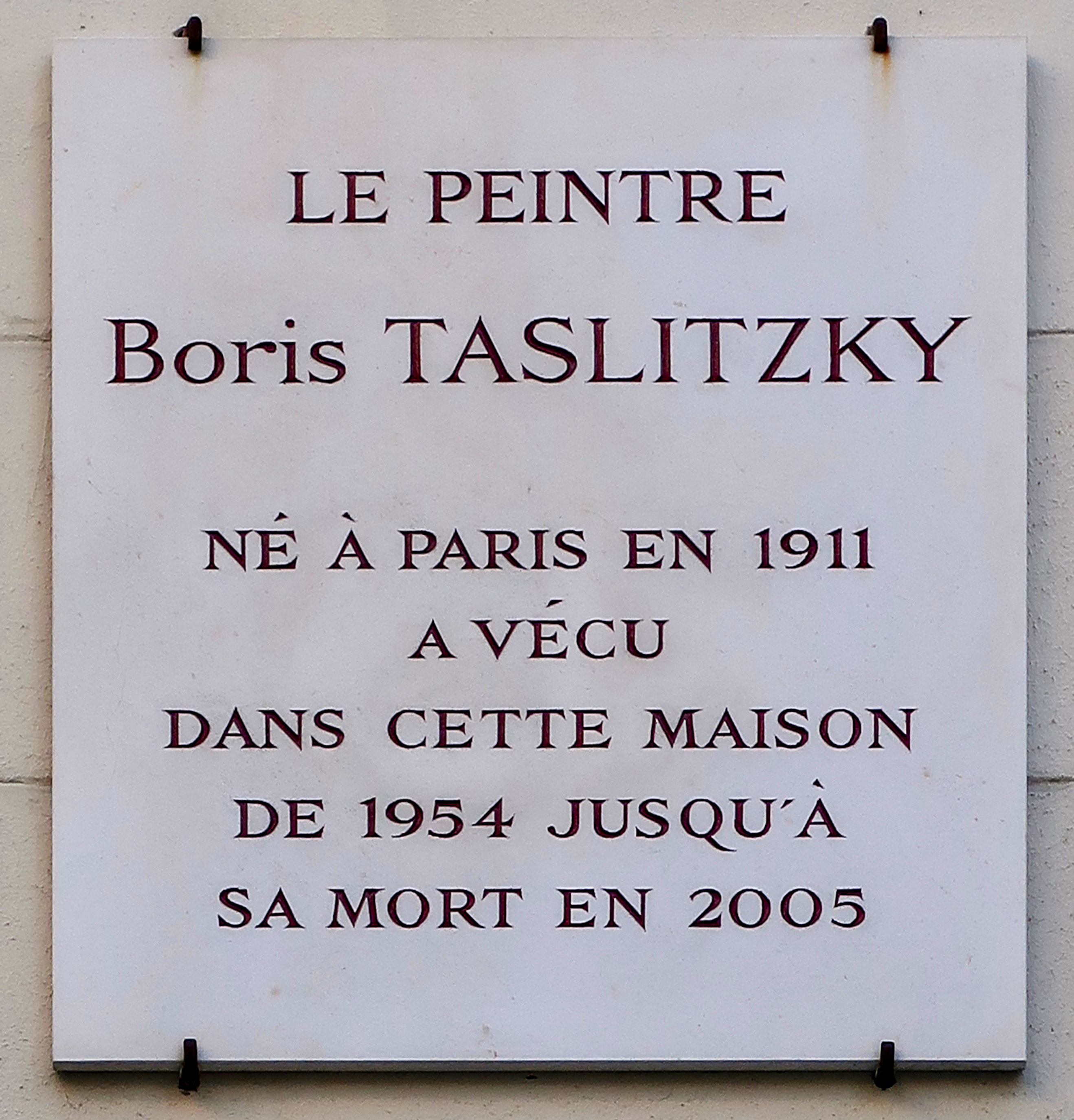
Plaque Boris Taslitzky, 5 rue Racine, Paris 6e

Taslitzky died on December 9, 2005, in Paris.

== Collections ==
- Musée National d'Art Moderne, Paris
- Pushkin Museum, Moscow
- Musée d'Art Moderne de la Ville de Paris
- Cité nationale de l'histoire de l'immigration
- Tate gallery, London : Les Grèves de juin 1936 (1936), La mort de Danielle Casanova (study) (1949), Riposte (1951).

== See also ==
- Young Man with Apples, 1932 Amrita Sher-Gil painting of Taslitzky

== Bibliography ==
- Dalmia, Yashodhara (2013). Amrita Sher-Gil: A Life. Gurugram: Penguin Books. ISBN 978-0-14-342026-2.
