= Böttcherstraße =

Street in Bremen, Germany

Coordinates: 53°04′30″N 08°48′20″E

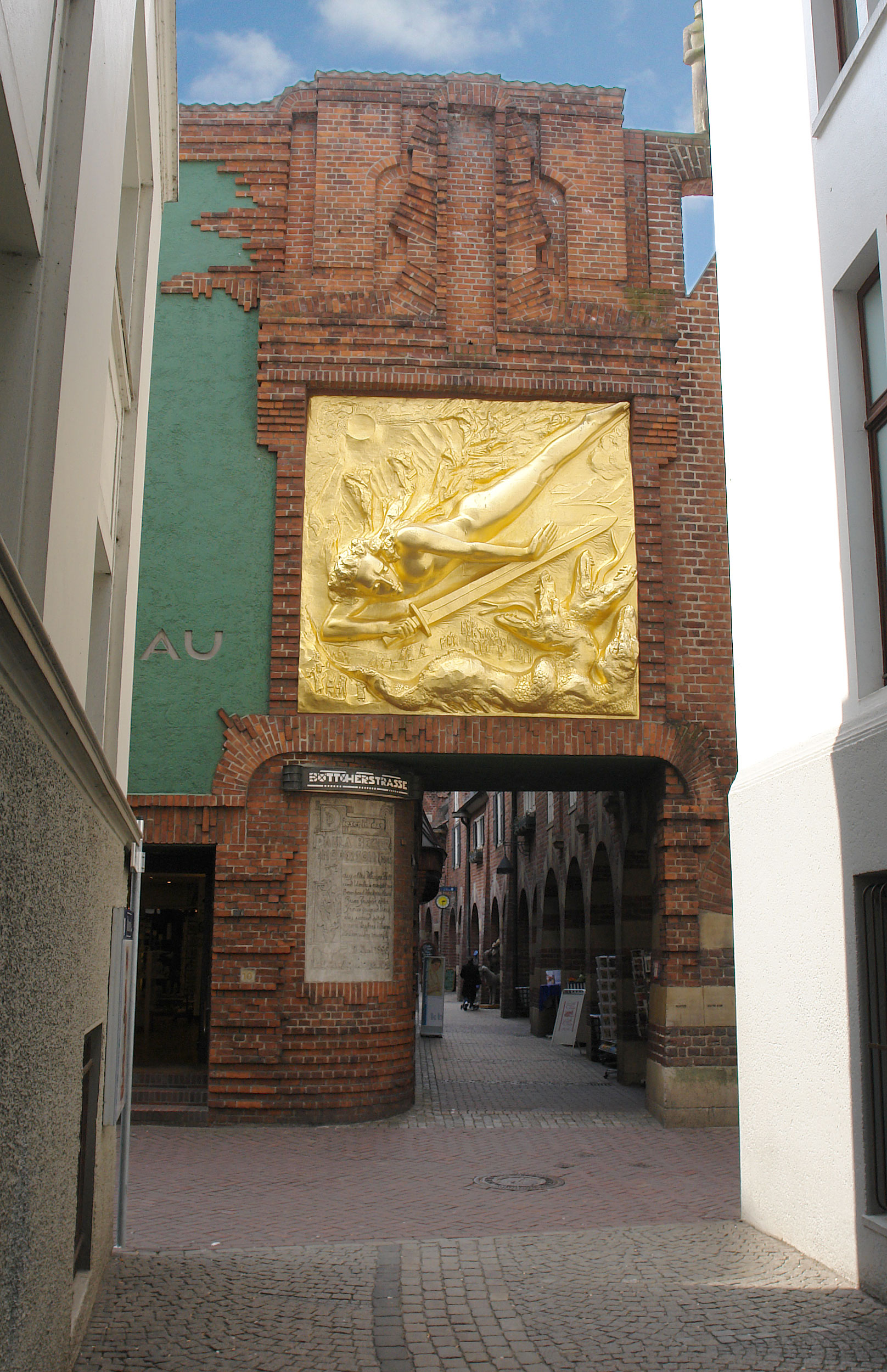
Entrance to Böttcherstraße: Lichtbringer ("Bringer of Light") by Hoetger, April 1936, showing Michael (archangel) battling the forces of evil.

Böttcherstraße is a street in the historic centre of Bremen, Germany. Only about 100 m (330 ft) long, it is famous for its unusual architecture and ranks among the city's main cultural landmarks and visitor attractions. Most of its buildings were erected between 1922 and 1931, primarily as a result of the initiative of Ludwig Roselius, a Bremen-based coffee-trader, who charged Bernhard Hoetger with the artistic supervision over the project. The street and its buildings are a rare example of an architectural ensemble belonging to a variant of the expressionist style. Several of the houses can be classed as Brick Expressionism. Since 1973, the ensemble has been protected by the Monument Protection Act.

== Overview ==
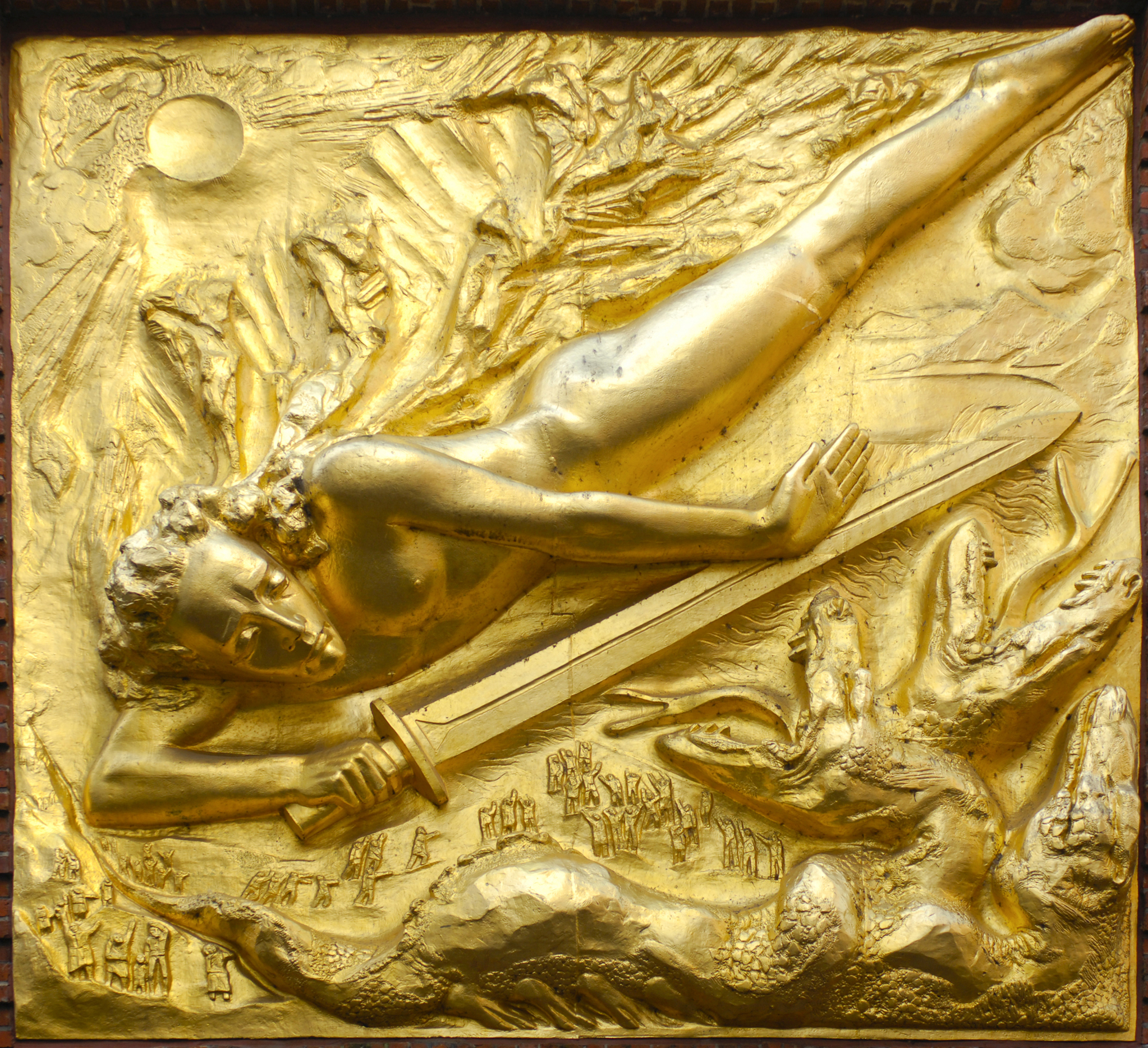
Lichtbringer (detail)

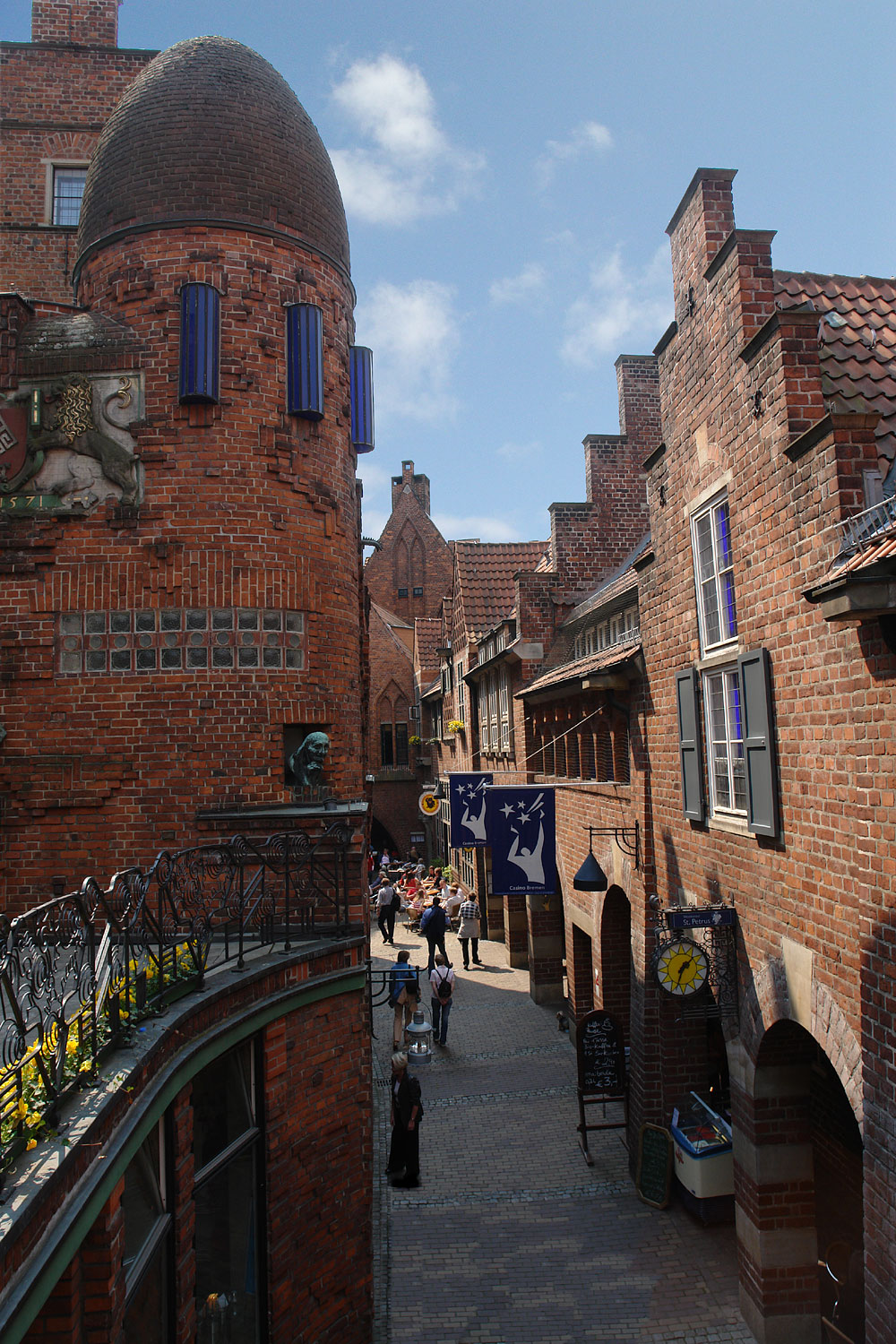
View from the Paula Modersohn-Becker Haus towards Haus St. Petrus

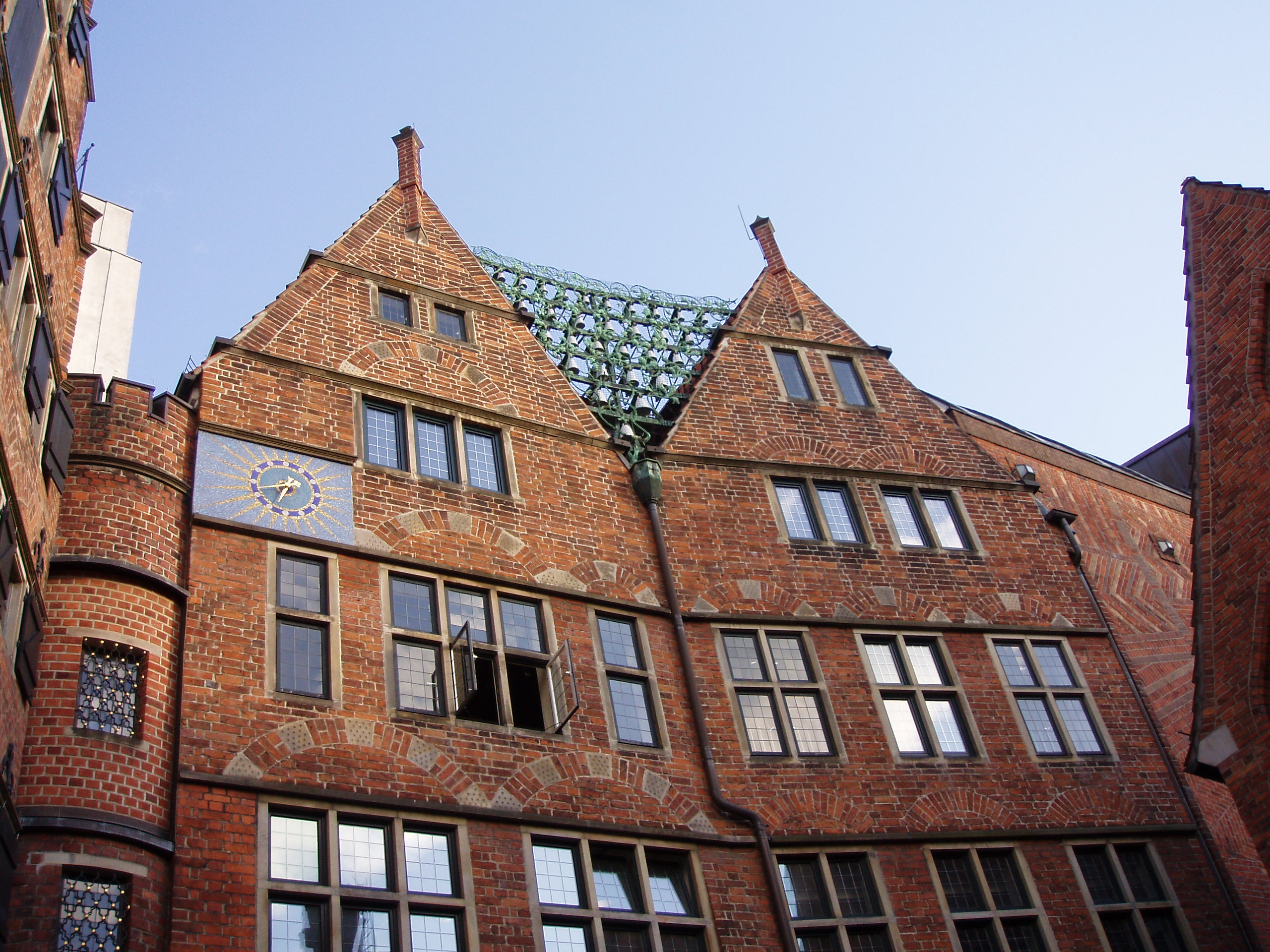
Haus des Glockenspiels

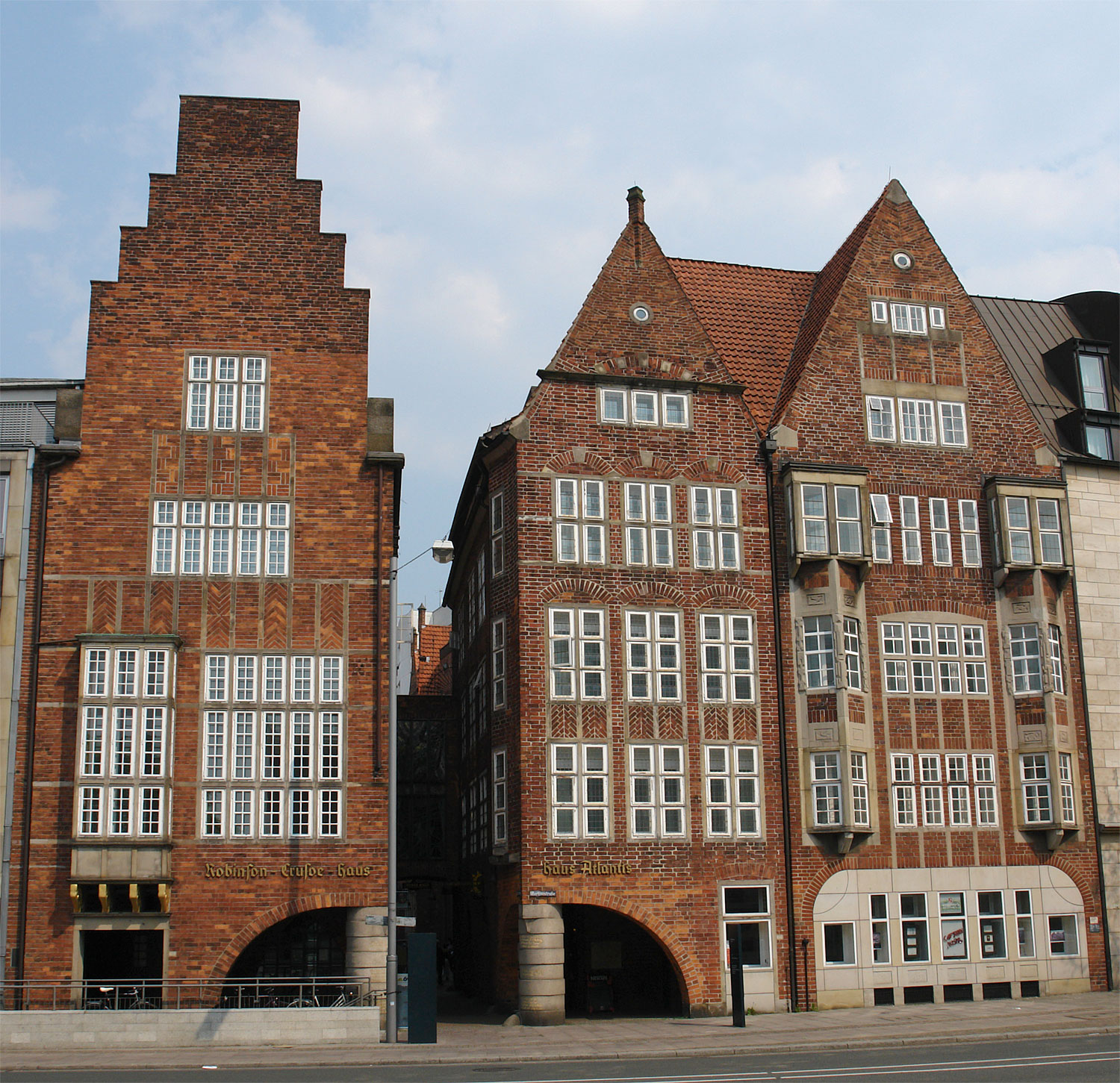
Robinson-Crusoe-Haus and Haus Atlantis (Martinistraße)

Roselius, a sympathiser of National Socialism, pursued Völkisch-Nordic cultural ideas influenced by the ideologists Julius Langbehn and Herman Wirth, involving a belief in the irreplaceable value of the Nordic race. He aimed to have these ideas materialise in Böttcherstraße. Roselius stated "The re-erection of Böttcherstraße is an attempt to think German." And: "I want, and that is the deepest aim of what was created in Böttcherstraße, to break the spell of the banishment the ill-informed Romans sentenced our people to, which still weighs upon us." Although Roselius and Hoetger paid tribute to Hitler as the "Bringer of Light" on a relief at the entrance, the Führer rejected this variant of völkisch art in a Reichsparteitag speech about cultural matters ("Kulturtagung im Opernhaus") on 9 September 1936, in which he dismissively referred to Boettcher-Straßen-Kultur ("culture in the style of the Böttcherstraße"). The NSDAP dressed Böttcherstraße down as reflecting a "divergent view of culture", and while the street was listed as an architectural monument on 7 May 1937, it was listed as an "example of the degenerate art of the Weimar period". Roselius tried to become a member of the NSDAP twice but his application was rejected twice due to his 'degenerate art' and independence that the Nazis found disconcerting. In October 1936 Ludwig Roselius injected more capital into Focke-Wulf aircraft company, thereby increasing his shareholding to 46% and regular board meetings were held in the Boettcherstrasse. Sosthenes Behn, chief of ITT secured 27.8%, and Hitler was outfoxed.

== History ==
The history of Böttcherstraße goes back to the Middle Ages. It constituted an important link between the market square and the Weser river. It was traditionally inhabited by coopers (Northern German: Böttcher). When the harbour was relocated in the mid-19th century, Böttcherstraße's importance began to fade.

In 1902 (some sources say 1906), Ludwig Roselius, under pressure from the previous owners, bought the house at 6 Böttcherstraße (today's Ludwig Roselius Museum) and made it the headquarters of his company, which would later produce the HAG coffee brand. He bought other lots in the street in the years thereafter. In the years after World War I, further offices, the HAG-Haus, the Haus St. Petrus, and the House of the Seven Lazy Brothers were constructed. The houses were built of typical materials of the time: brick and sandstone.

In contrast to these buildings, in 1926, Ludwig Roselius had the Paula Modersohn-Becker-Haus built to serve as a museum dedicated to the painter Paula Modersohn-Becker. The building's external walls have relief-like decorations, and its internal rooms follow principles of organic architecture.

In 1931 the Atlantis House (Haus Atlantis) was completed. Its distinctive style and materials (glass, steel, and concrete) produced a further striking contrast to the other structures. The Robinson Crusoe House (Robinson-Crusoe Haus) was also erected in 1931.

In early 1934 Ludwig Roselius, Otto Wagener and Hitler had a meeting with Hitler criticizing Roselius for allowing his architect Bernhard Hoetger free rein regarding the expressionist architecture in the Böttcherstrasse whereby Roselius had to defend Hoetger and then change the subject to a more general discussion of architecture.

In 1944, large proportions of Böttcherstraße were destroyed by aerial bombing. By 1954, the Kaffee HAG company had restored most of the facades to their original state.

In 1979, Ludwig Roselius Jr. sold the Kaffee HAG company, along with Böttcherstraße, to General Foods. Two years later, he bought Böttcherstraße back. Since then, it has been privately owned.

Significant damage to the building fabric became apparent in 1989. The Sparkasse Bremen bank bought the whole street and all its buildings, except Haus Atlantis. Restoration was completed by 1999.

In 2004 ownership passed to a foundation (Stiftung Bremer Sparer Dank). It is now administrated by Böttcherstraße GmbH, a limited company and subsidiary of Sparkasse Bremen.

== Present ==
Today, Böttcherstraße is one of the major tourist attractions of Bremen. It contains several art museums (Museen Böttcherstraße), Arts and crafts workshops, bars, restaurants, shops and a hotel. Nearly all buildings and plots are owned by the foundation. A major attraction is the carillon of Meissen porcelain bells at the Glockenspiel House which chimes three times a day.

== Bibliography ==
- Ludwig Leidig: Bombshell. Sbpra 2013, ISBN 978-1-62516-346-2
- Arn Strohmeyer: Der gebaute Mythos: Das Haus Atlantis in der Bremer Böttcherstraße – ein deutsches Missverständnis. Donat, Bremen 1993, ISBN 3-924444-67-6
- Arn Strohmeyer: Parsifal in Bremen. Richard Wagner, Ludwig Roselius und die Böttcherstraße. VDG, Weimar 2002, ISBN 3-89739-263-1
- Hans Tallasch (Hrsg.): Projekt Böttcherstraße. Aschenbeck & Holstein, Delmenhorst 2002, ISBN 3-932292-29-4

== See also ==
- Brick Expressionism
