= Bernhard Hoetger =

German sculptor (1874–1949)

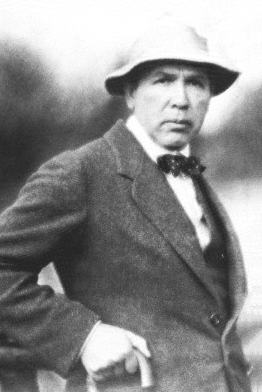
Berhard Hoetger, about 1924

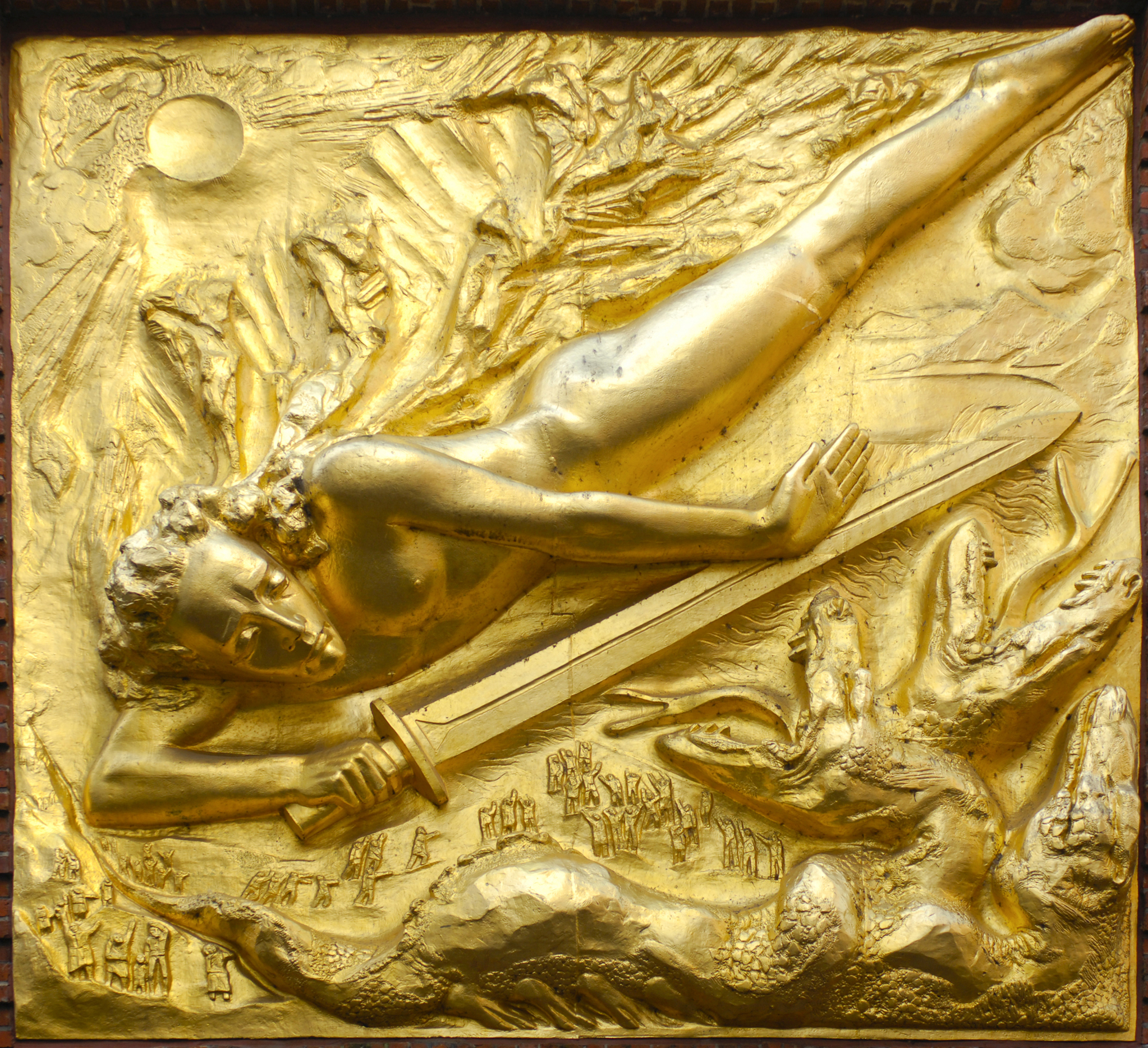
Lichtbringer ("Bringer of Light") by Hoetger (1936), located in Bremen's Böttcherstraße

Bernhard Hoetger (4 May 1874 – 18 July 1949) was a German sculptor, painter and handicrafts artist of the Expressionist movement.

== Life ==
Hoetger was born in Dortmund as the son of a blacksmith. He studied sculpture in Detmold from 1888 to 1892, before directing a workshop in Rheda-Wiedenbrück. After a spell at the Düsseldorf Arts Academy, he took a trip to Paris, where he was deeply influenced by Auguste Rodin, but also got to know Paula Modersohn-Becker. Later he was able to familiarise himself with Antoni Gaudí. In 1911, Hoetger was called up to the Darmstadt Artists' Colony, where he was to remain for some time.

== Art Nouveau ==
During the art nouveau movement Hoetger's sculptures were sold in Paris at La Maison Moderne (LMM). Second only to L'Art Nouveau Bing, LMM was one of the leading purveyors of home goods in the art nouveau style. LMM was run by Julius Meier-Graefe who, like Bing, was Jewish.

== Böttcherstraße ==
In 1914, inspired by Modersohn-Becker, he moved to Worpswede. It was here where he met the Bremen entrepreneur Ludwig Roselius, with whom he would go on to make his masterpiece, Bremen's Böttcherstraße, in an Expressionist style. In particular he was responsible for the Atlantis House, which reflected the race-theories of the Nazi ethnographer Herman Wirth.

== HAG-TURM ==
He also designed the HAG-TURM, a building sponsored by Roselius's firm Kaffee HAG at the 1928 Pressa International Press Exhibition. The HAG-Turm was a 42-metre (138 ft) tower. This was built in 70 days. The building had ten storeys which contained all the working machinery necessary to create a working factory. 37 flags were on display on the front of tower representing the global reach of the company. Statistical and historical information was provided about coffee production, highlighting the part played by Café HAG. Scientific and medical experts were also present to provide further information to the public. Café HAG had become famous for their process of decaffination and so there was also information about the bad effects of caffeine on human and animal health.

== Nazi party links ==
Although Roselius was an ardent supporter of Nazism, Hitler denounced the art and architecture in the Boettcherstrasse. Roselius contemplated suicide, but his secretary Barbara Goette intervened with Hitler in Berlin and Café HAG, Roselius' corporation, invested heavily in Focke-Wulf consequently outmanoeuvering Hitler. Like his patron Ludwig Roselius, Hoetger sympathised with the Nazi ideals and became a member of the Nazi Party. He moved to Berlin in 1934 and tried, in vain, to instill himself through his art into the party, but in 1936 Hitler declared it to be degenerate art. Expelled from the party, in 1943 Hoetger fled to Switzerland. He died in 1949 in Interlaken.

Selections
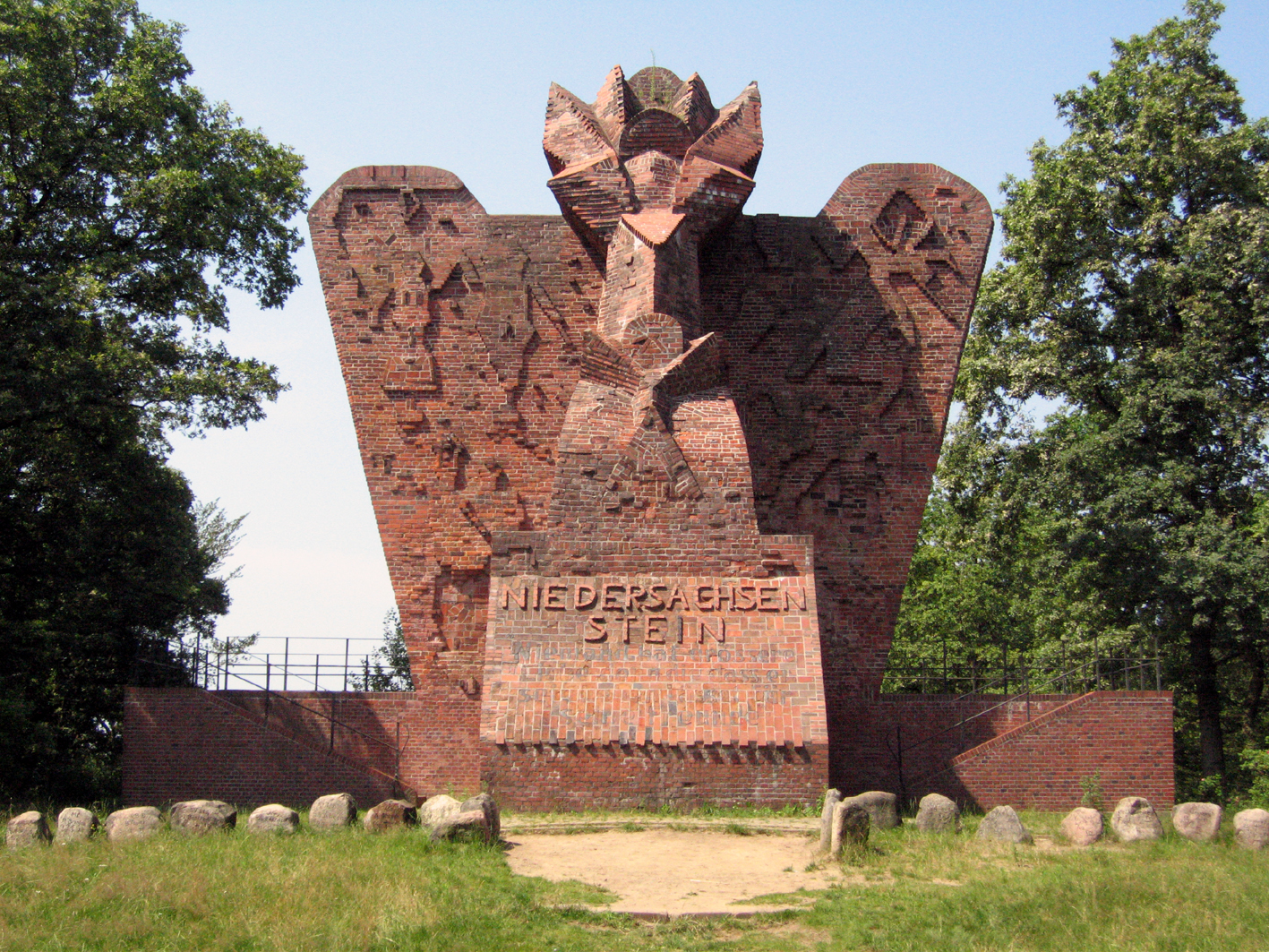
The "Niedersachsenstein" in Worpswede, Germany

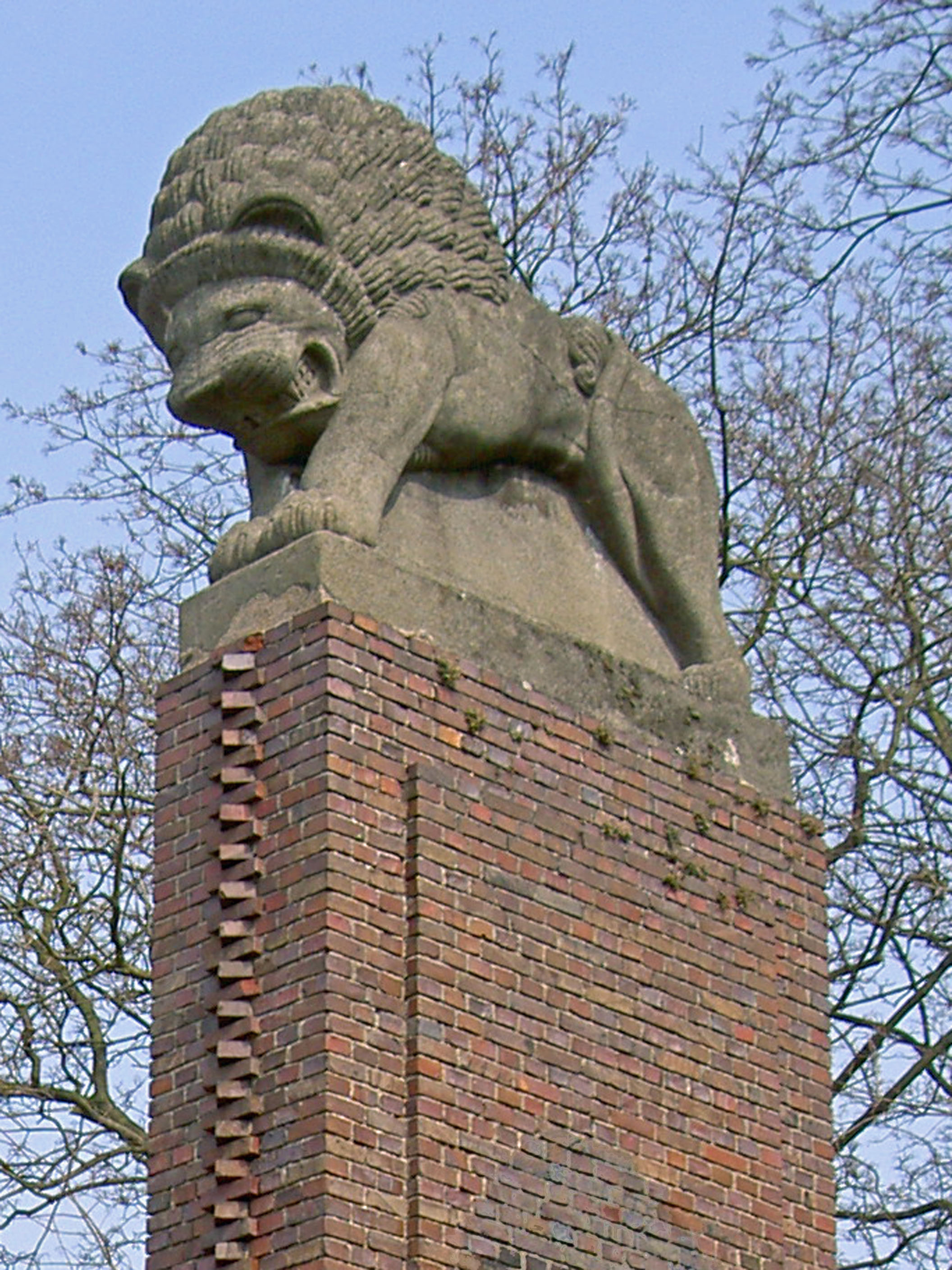
Lion Gate at Darmstadt (with Albin Müller)

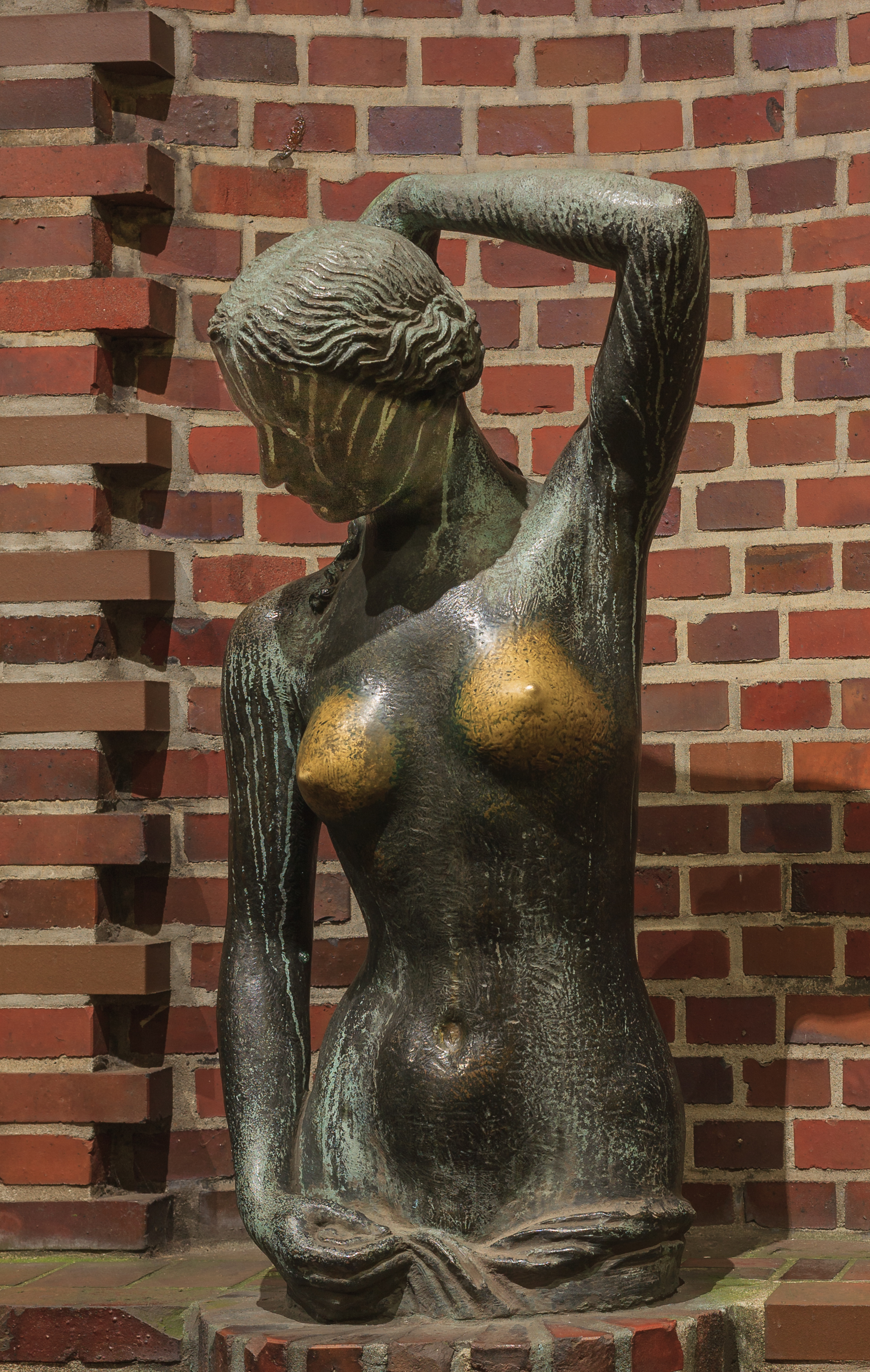
Jugend (Youth) Torso in Bremen, Böttcherstraße

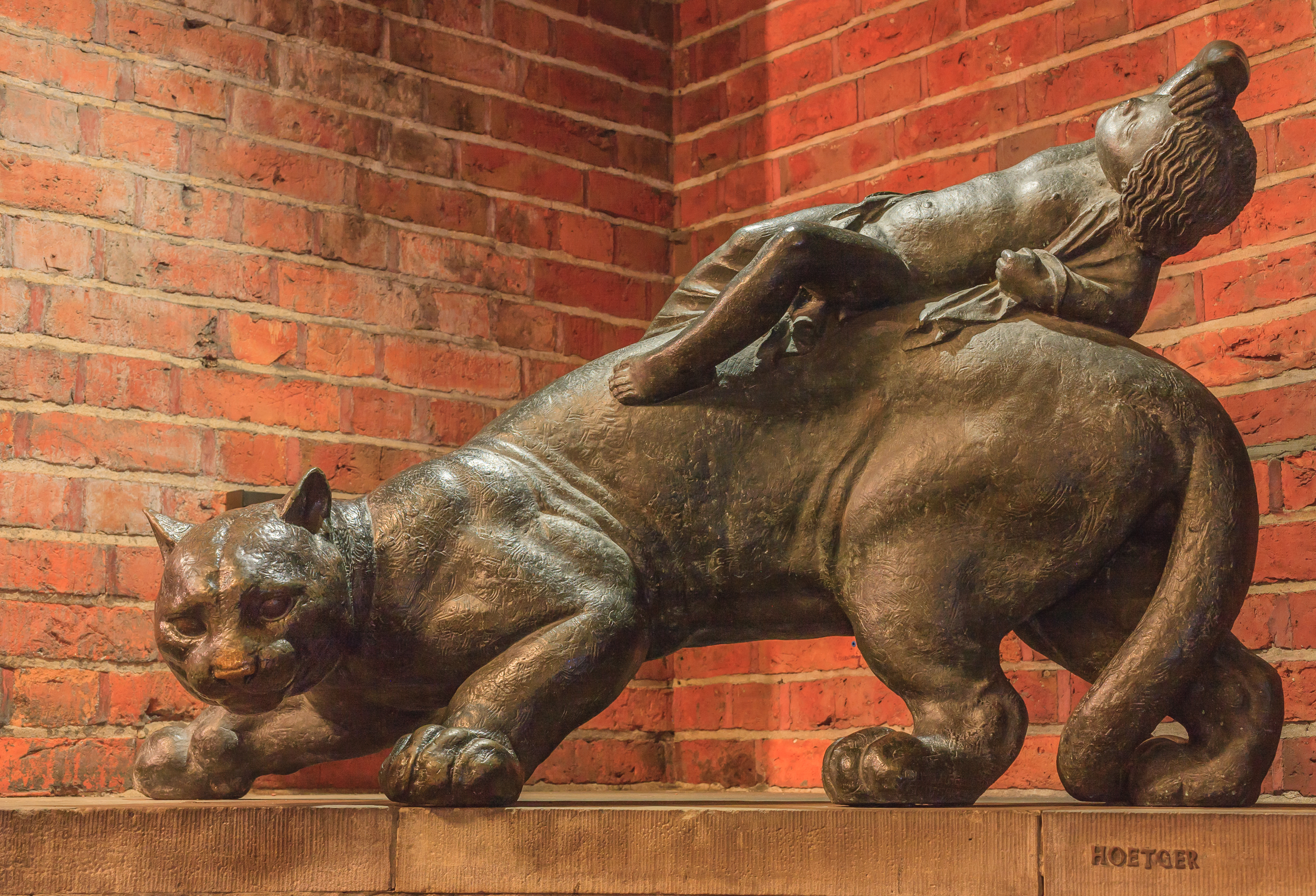
Sculpture "Puma carrying the Day" in Bremen, Böttcherstraße
