= Ludwig Roselius =

German coffee merchant

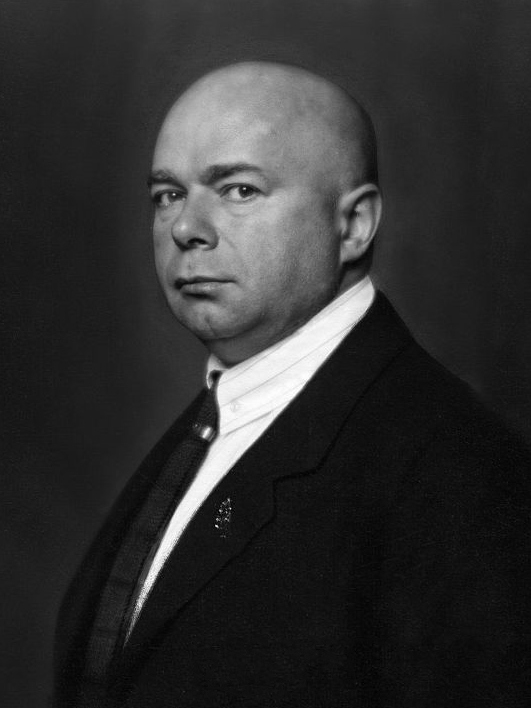
- Ludwig Roselius by Nicola Perscheid c. 1905
- Born: 2 June 1874; Bremen, German Empire
- Died: 15 May 1943 (aged 68); Berlin, Nazi Germany
- Known for: Art, Coffee and politics

Ludwig Roselius (2 June 1874 – 15 May 1943) was a German coffee merchant and founder of the company Kaffee HAG. He was born in Bremen and is credited with the development of commercial decaffeination of coffee. As a patron, he supported artists like Paula Modersohn-Becker and Bernard Hoetger and turned the Böttcherstrasse street in Bremen into an artwork.

== Life ==
Roselius was born in Bremen. In 1902, Ludwig Roselius purchased the centrally located No. 4 Böttcherstrasse. It soon became the head office of his business Roselius & Co. which in 1906 established Kaffee HAG (Kaffee Handels Aktien Gesellschaft).

He was a supporter of Die Brücke institute and started publication of the famous heraldic Coffee Hag albums in the described formats of the Brücke. In his home town he built an entertaining house known as the Glockenspiel House.

During the Third Reich, "Politically a conservative, Roselius had a positive attitude towards National Socialism and initially supported Hitler with whom he had a private meeting in Bremen in 1922." Roselius applied for Nazi Party membership twice and was rejected twice because he promoted 'degenerate art' in his Böttcherstrasse. Roselius was a patron member of the SS, and member of the national socialist Academy for German Law. Joseph Goebbels appointed him as a board member of the Werberat der deutschen Wirtschaft (Council of the German advertising industry).

Apparently he had later a falling-out with Hitler – though not with the Nazi ideology – because Roselius believed in the existence of or lobbied for the creation of a purebred "Lower German race" ("Lower" as a geographical term – as in "Lower Saxony") and Hitler did not. 4 Million RM was raised by Heinz Puvogel shortly after Ludwig Roselius died but when questioned after World War II by IARA, investigators lied and turned a blind eye due to a coverup about U.S. multinational ITT Corporation owning 29% of Focke-Wulf and possible future class action payouts as the U.S. government failed to nationalize the ITT Corporation after Pearl Harbor.

In 1928, Roselius expanded his house in the Böttcherstrasse to accommodate his art collection.

Roselius took an early interest in the aircraft industry and in 1925 he became Chairman of Focke-Wulf Flugzeugbau A.G.. In early 1933 he handed it over to his brother Friedrich, who died in 1941. In 1938 the Bremen-based company was reconstituted as Focke-Wulf Flugzeugbau GmbH, and Roselius' HAG group increased its holding to 46%. Lorenz A.G., a subsidiary of I.T.T., came in with 28% and supplied the latest technology. At this time a substantial capital injection was made.

In 1934, Roselius had his left leg amputated due to bone cancer. He also suffered from recurring fevers and other illnesses. In early 1935 his youngest daughter married tenor Ivo Götte. When Roselius met Ivo's sister Barbara Goette, who had just completed her state examinations in mathematics, physics and philosophy with distinction at Kiel University, he immediately offered her a position with the concern. Although she had intended to commence her Ph.D. in philosophy, she accepted the offer. Over time she became his carer, companion, and closest collaborator. He needed someone to look after him on his many worldwide voyages and help him with his books and publications. Barbara's academic credentials complemented his 'streetwise' business acumen. They became a formidable team.

Roselius credited Barbara with having saved his life when Hitler denounced both Roselius's Böttcherstasse and his Nordic views at the September 1936 Nuremberg Nazi party rally. Roselius joined the German Resistance in 1942 after Barbara Goette urged the need for better conditions for the forced workers and POWs at Focke-Wulf. Later, his daughter recognized that Barbara had been responsible for Roselius finding his way back to a more moderate political outlook. As a debt of gratitude and to cement her place in aviation history, he had the new FW200c 4-engined passenger airliner fitted with 26 seats as Barbara's birthday was on the 26th. He knew pilot Hans Baur. Barbara looked after Roselius for the final nine months of his life in the now demolished Hotel Kaiserhof in Berlin and she held his hand shortly before he died. They were very much in love but it was always a platonic relationship.

== Legacy ==
Böttcherstrasse was declared to be degenerate art in the 1930s and was largely destroyed during the war. After the war the houses were rebuilt by Roselius's coffee company and it is now open to the public. The museums include Ludwig Roselius Museum which exhibits his collections.

== See also ==
- Böttcherstrasse
- Barbara Goette
