= Alfred Runge =

German architect

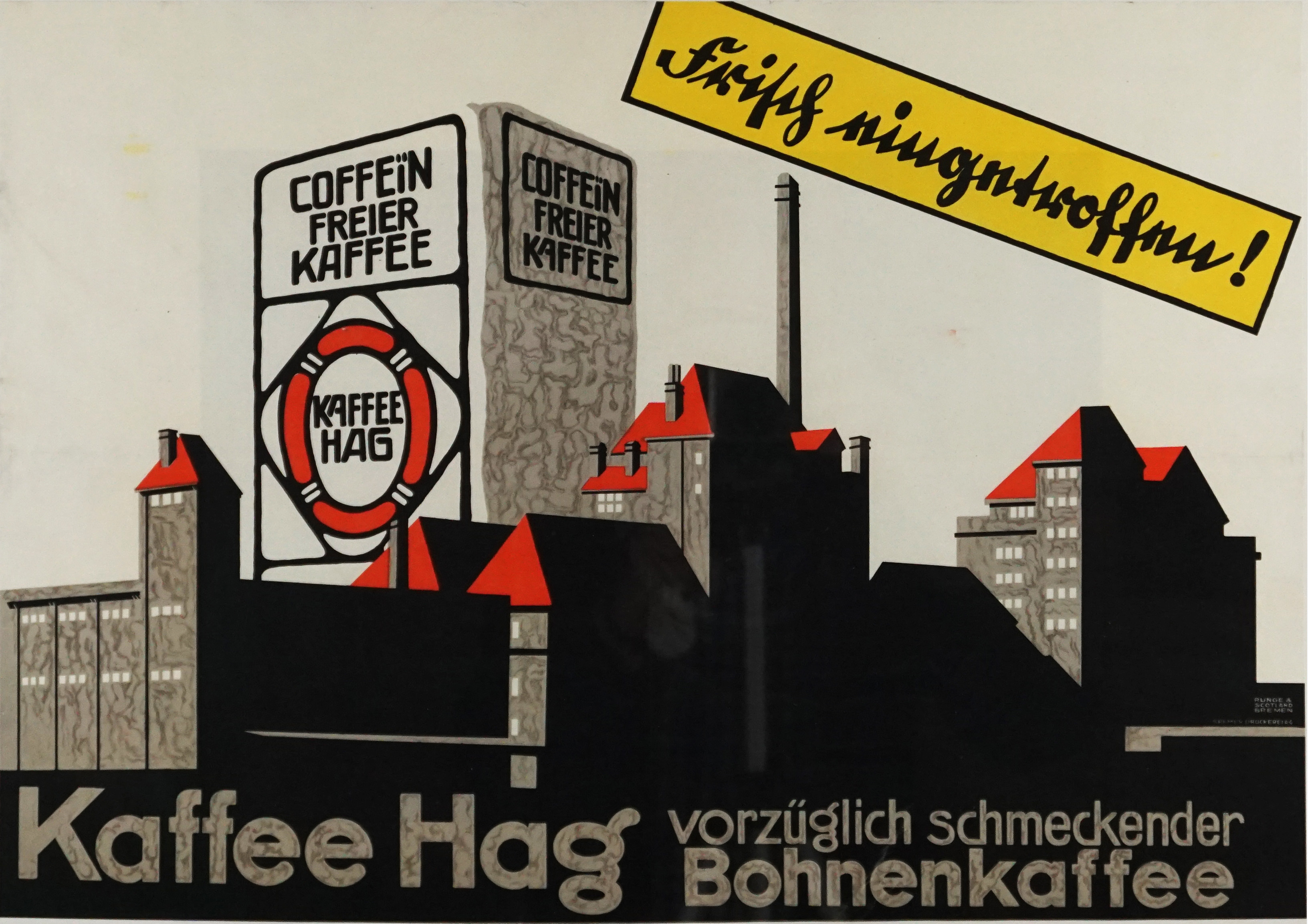
Ad in collaboration with Eduard Scotland for Kaffe HAG (1911)

Alfred Runge (1881–1946) was a German architect active in Bremen and its surroundings. He is remembered in particular for the Böttcherstraße houses he and his associate Eduard Scotland built for coffee merchant Ludwig Roselius.

== Early life ==
Born in Osnabrück, he completed an apprenticeship as a mason until he moved to Bremen in 1898 where he attended the Technical College, graduating in 1903.

== Career ==
In July 1904, he joined his student friend Eduard Scotland (1885–1945) to work as an architect and building contractor in Bremen, founding the firm "Runge & Scotland". From 1906 to 1915, they designed a number of residential and commercial buildings in the Lower Saxony style in Bremen and its surroundings. The pair attracted the attention of Norddeutscher Lloyd, Heinrich Wiegand, who commissioned them to build him a residence on Wagner-Straße.

He and Scotland attracted the attention of the director of Norddeutscher Lloyd, Heinrich Wiegand, who commissioned him together with Runge to build a residence for him on Bremen's Wagner-Straße. Thereafter he received numerous assignments in Schwachhausen and the Bremen surroundings.

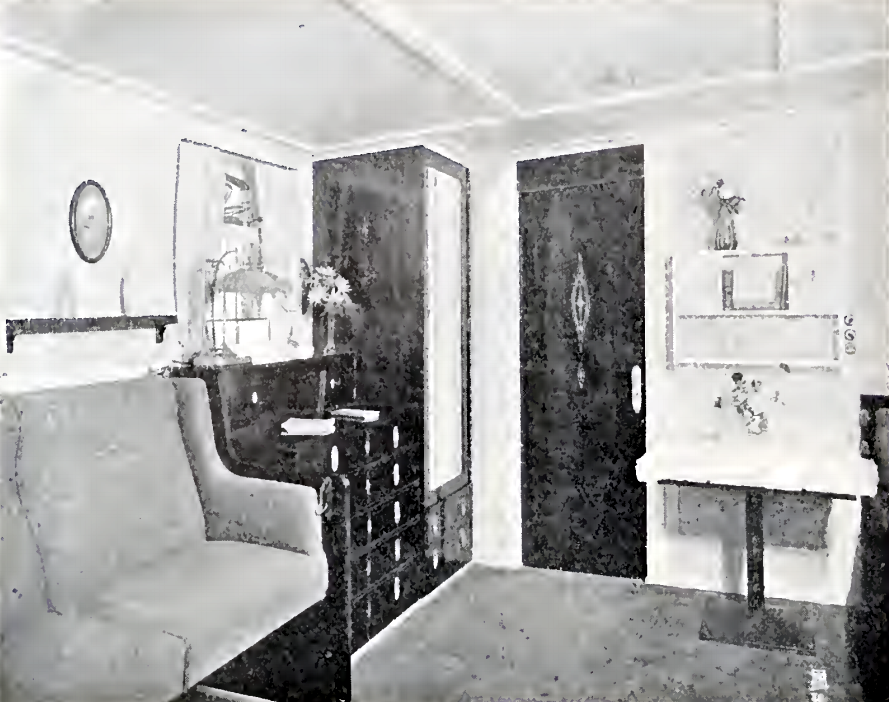
Cabin design by Scotland and Runge for the SS Kronprinzessin Cecilie

In 1907 Wiegard trusted Scotland and Runge with the interior design of the SS Kronprinzessin Cecilie which his company launched in 1907 to be the regular ocean liner that linked Bremen with New York. They designed luxury cabins where the beds would convert to sofas and the washstands would convert into tables. All of the metalwork was gilded; the surfaces were generally white while the wooden surfaces of amaranth was inlaid with agate, ivory and citron wood. From 1906, the pair established a relationship with Ludwig Roselius, assisting him with the presentation and marketing of his goods, especially designs for Café HAG. In 1916, they planned the conversion of his residence on Bleicherstraße. Runge and Scotland went on to design several buildings for Ludwig Roselius on Bremen's Böttcherstraße including the Glockenspiel House (1924), the House of the Seven Lazy Brothers (1927), St Petrus House (1927), Atlantis House (1931), and Robinson Crusoe House (1931),
