= Eduard Scotland =

German architect

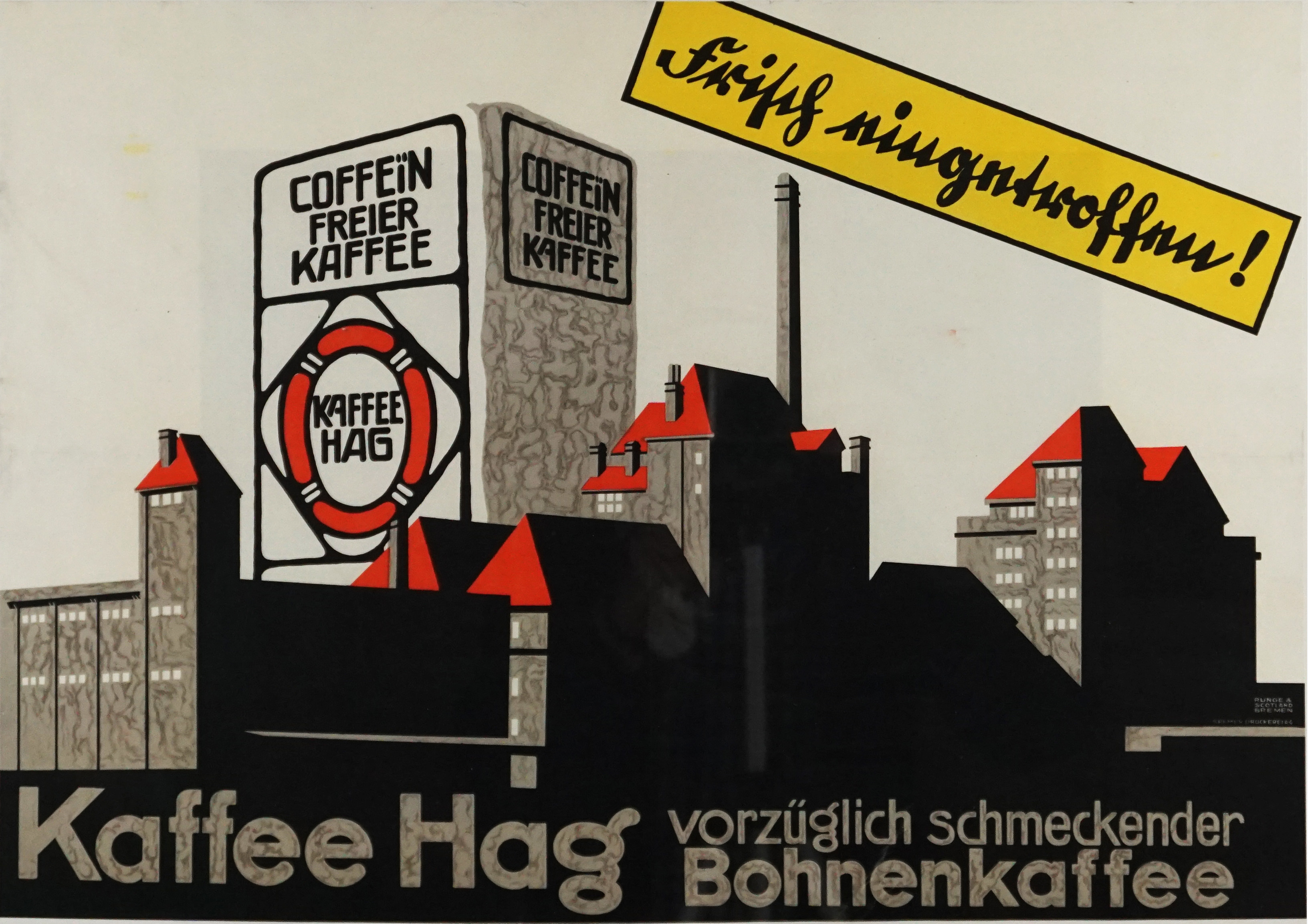
Ad in collaboration with Alfred Runge for Kaffe HAG (1911)

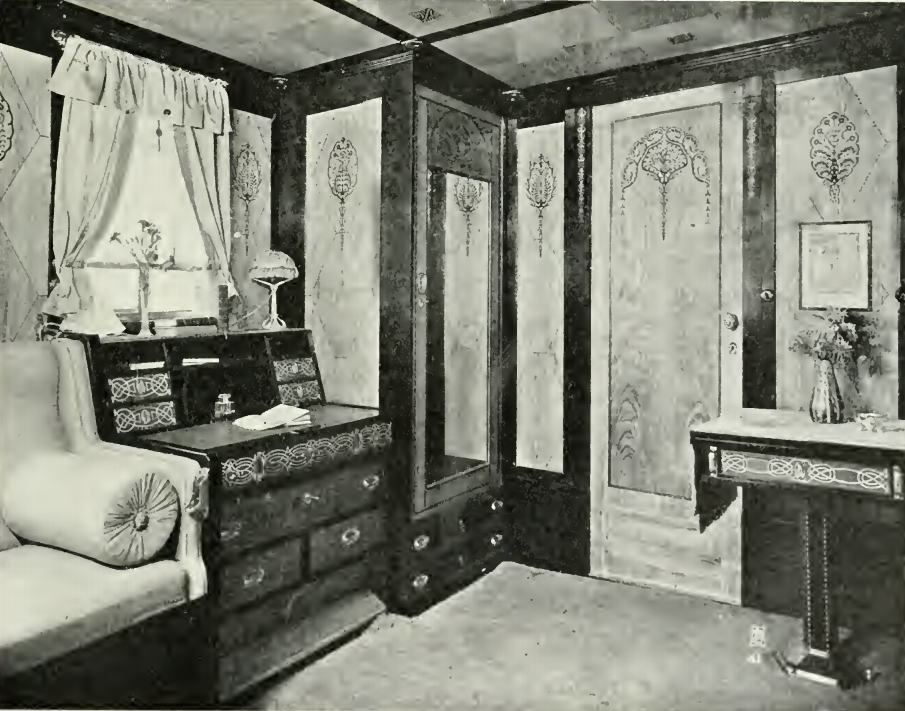
Eduard Scotland and Alfred Runge's design for the Bremen ship SS Kronprinzessin Cecilie

Eduard Scotland (1885–1945) was a German architect active in Bremen. He is remembered in particular for the Böttcherstraße houses he and his associate Alfred Runge built for the coffee merchant Ludwig Roselius.

== Early life ==
As a child, Scotland aspired to become a painter but on his father's advice he studied architecture. After serving an apprenticeship as a mason, he attended the Technical College in Bremen where he graduated in 1903.

== Career ==
In July 1904, he joined his student friend Alfred Runge (1881–1946) to work as an architect and building contractor in Bremen. He was also active as a draftsman and painter. As a result of the first few small buildings he completed, he attracted the attention of the director of Norddeutscher Lloyd, Heinrich Wiegand, who commissioned him together with Runge to build a residence for him on Bremen's Wagner-Straße. Thereafter he received numerous assignments in Schwachhausen and the Bremen surroundings.

In 1907 Wiegard awarded Runge and Scotland a contract to design the interiors of the four-funnel ocean liner SS Kronprinzessin Cecilie which his company launched in 1907. Earlier ships interiors had been designed by Johann Poppe who still designed the main rooms whilst Scotland & Runge did de luxe cabins and other rooms. The ship was to be the regular ocean liner that linked Bremen with New York City. They designed the luxury cabins where the beds would convert to sofas and the washstands would convert into tables. All of the metalwork was gilded and the surfaces were white with wooden surfaces of violet amaranth inlaid with agate, ivory and citron wood.

Runge and Scotland also worked as graphic designers and they designed iconic posters and packaging for the Kaffee HAG company. They are credited with designs that defined the company.

In the 1920s, he and Runge went on to design several buildings for Ludwig Roselius on Bremen's Böttcherstraße including the Glockenspiel House (1924), the House of the Seven Lazy Brothers (1927), St Petrus House (1927), Atlantis House (1931), and Robinson Crusoe House (1931).
