= House of the Seven Lazy Brothers =

Historic building in Bremen, Germany

Coordinates: 53°04′31″N 8°48′22″E

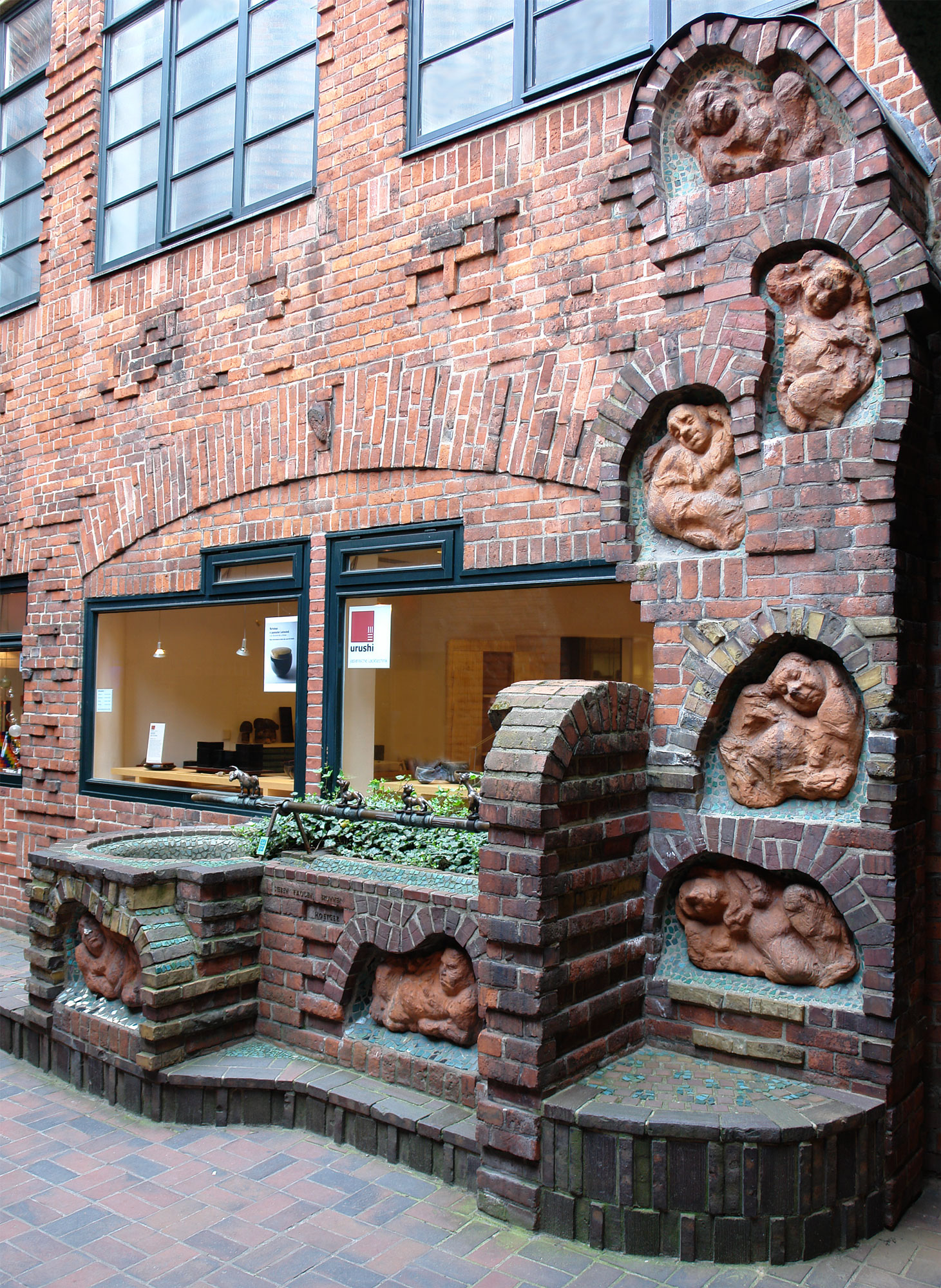
Fountain of the Seven Lazy Brothers

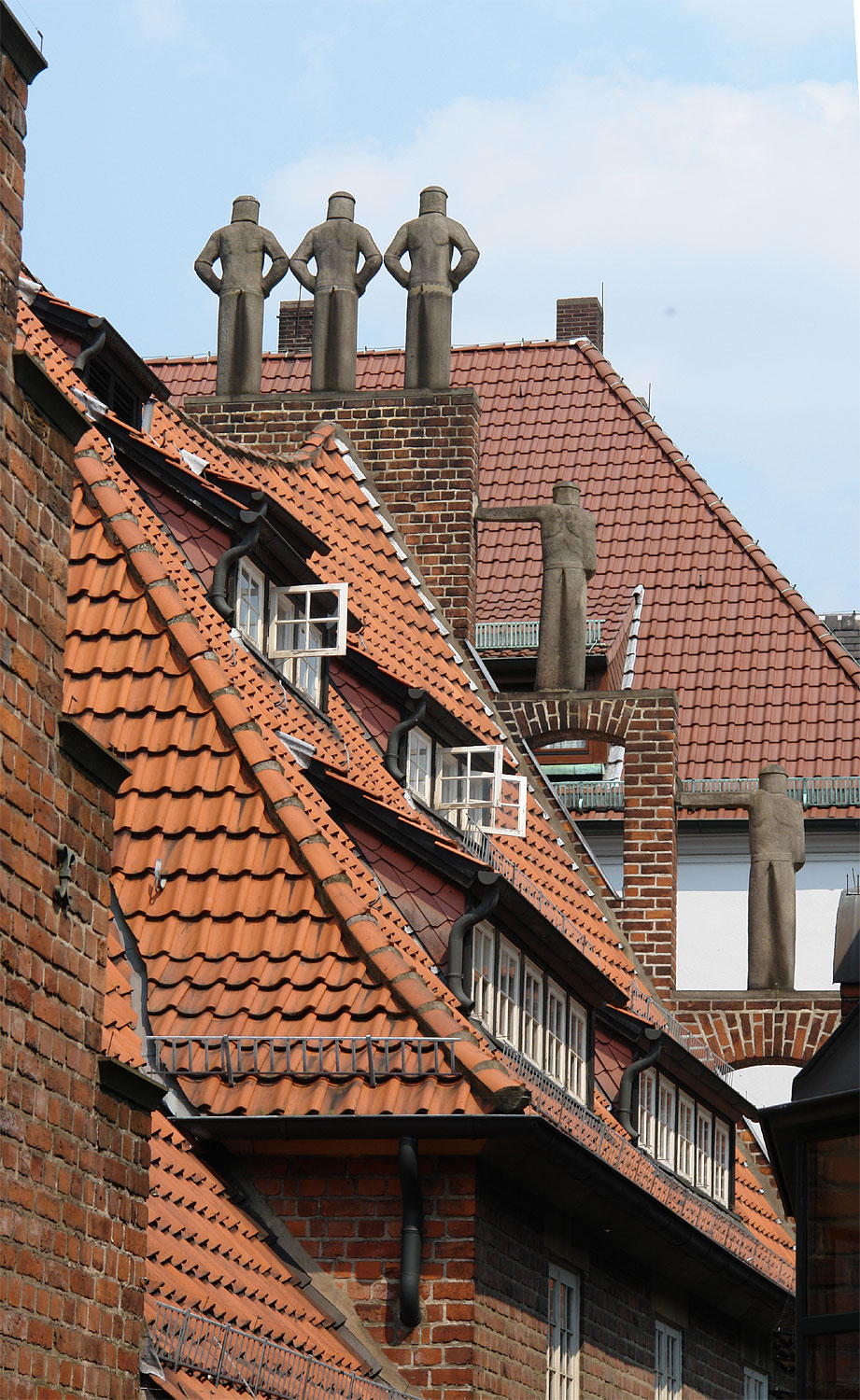
Figures on the stepped gable

The House of the Seven Lazy Brothers (German: Haus der Sieben Faulen) is a historic building in Bremen, Germany, completed in 1927. With a name based on a local legend, the building located in Böttcherstraße in the old town was built by the prosperous coffee merchant Ludwig Roselius to a design by Bremen architects Eduard Scotland and Alfred Runge. The first version of the house was home to the advertising department of Roselius's coffee company and the Deutscher Werkbund association of craftsmen. When it was rebuilt in 1954 the new design was based on a traditional local story.

== Background ==
Crafted by Bernhard Hoetger, the Fountain of the Seven Lazy Brothers bordering the 1954 rebuild of the house was based on a legend about the sons of a local farmer who were considered lazy as they could find no work in Bremen. After venturing into the wide world for a few years, they returned to the city. With the benefit of experience, they worked in their father's fields, dug drainage ditches and built a dyke next to the Weser which prevented it from flooding. The citizens finally realized how astute they had been. While the fountain still presents seven lazy figures, the proud, upright statues on the gable above show how hard-working they had been.

== History and architecture ==
In 1924, Ludwig Roselius acquired a lease for a period of 60 years on the land on Böttcherstraße covering No. 15-19 and later also obtained permission to develop the old packhouses at No. 4-5. He persuaded the authorities to let him build a small colony of shops, studios and apartments there, drawing on North German architectural styles. Opposite the Paula Modersohn-Becker House, Runge and Scotland designed the long complex known as the HAG Haus (from the name of Roselius' company: Handels Aktien Gesellschaft). They included traditional North German features such as stepped gables, dormers and arcades. The only part of the building left after it was damaged in the war is the former Kaffee HAG coffee-tasting room. The remainder of the building was rebuilt based on the original style in 1954.

The figures standing on the top of the gable overlooking the Schütting are the work of Aloys Röhr from Münster. The figures of the seven brothers looking proud and far from lazy are said to be a homage to Roselius's ideas. Today, the building is home to a tea shop, a toy shop, and a gift shop.
