= Glockenspiel House =

Building in Bremen, Germany

Coordinates: 53°04′30″N 8°48′21″E

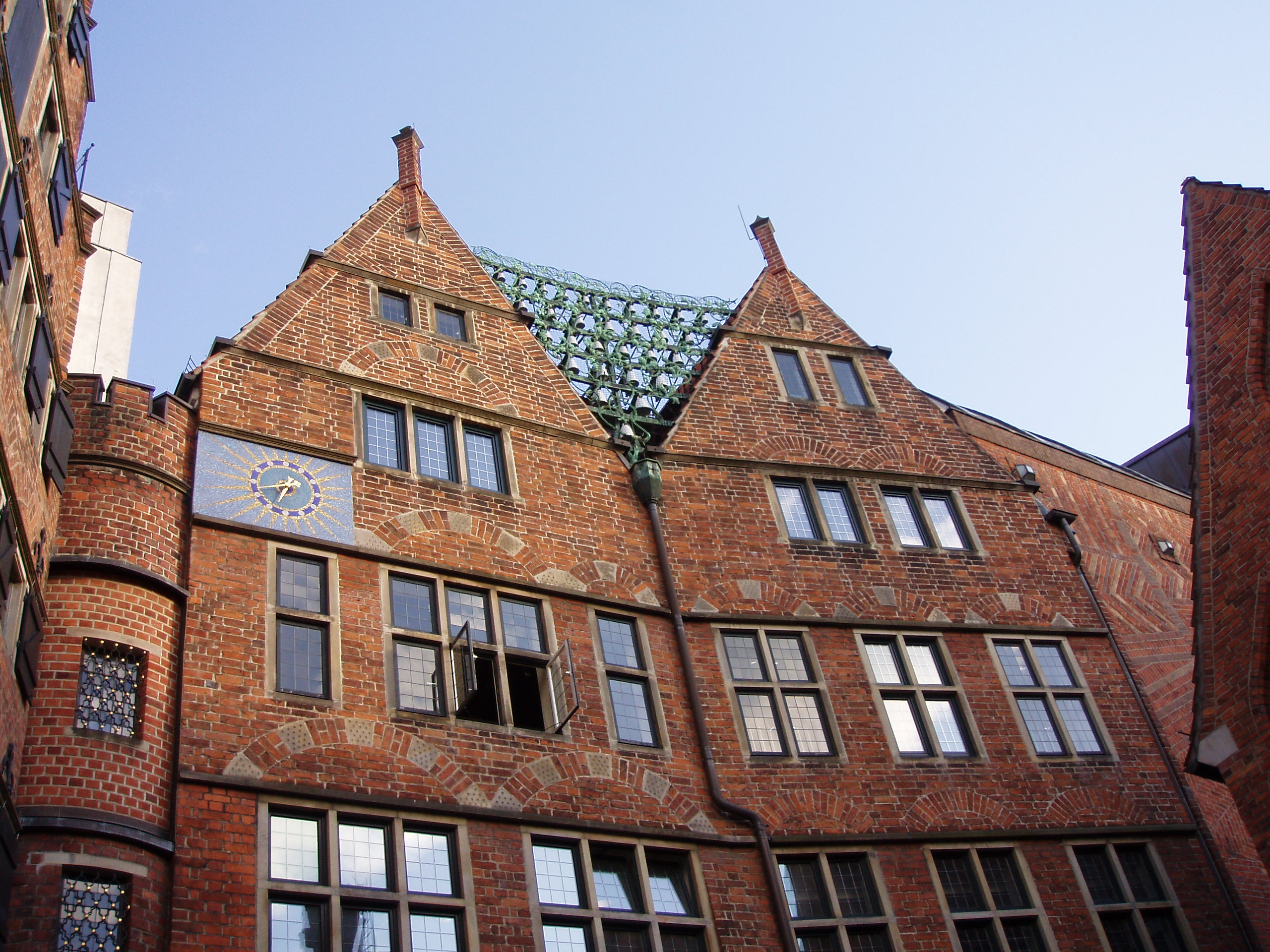
The Glockenspiel House on Bremen's Böttcherstraße

The Glockenspiel House (German: Haus des Glockenspiels) is a building in Bremen in the north of Germany. With its 30 bells of Meissen porcelain, the carillon (Glockenspiel) chimes three times a day while wooden panels depicting pioneering seafarers and aviators appear on a rotating mechanism inside the tower.

== History ==
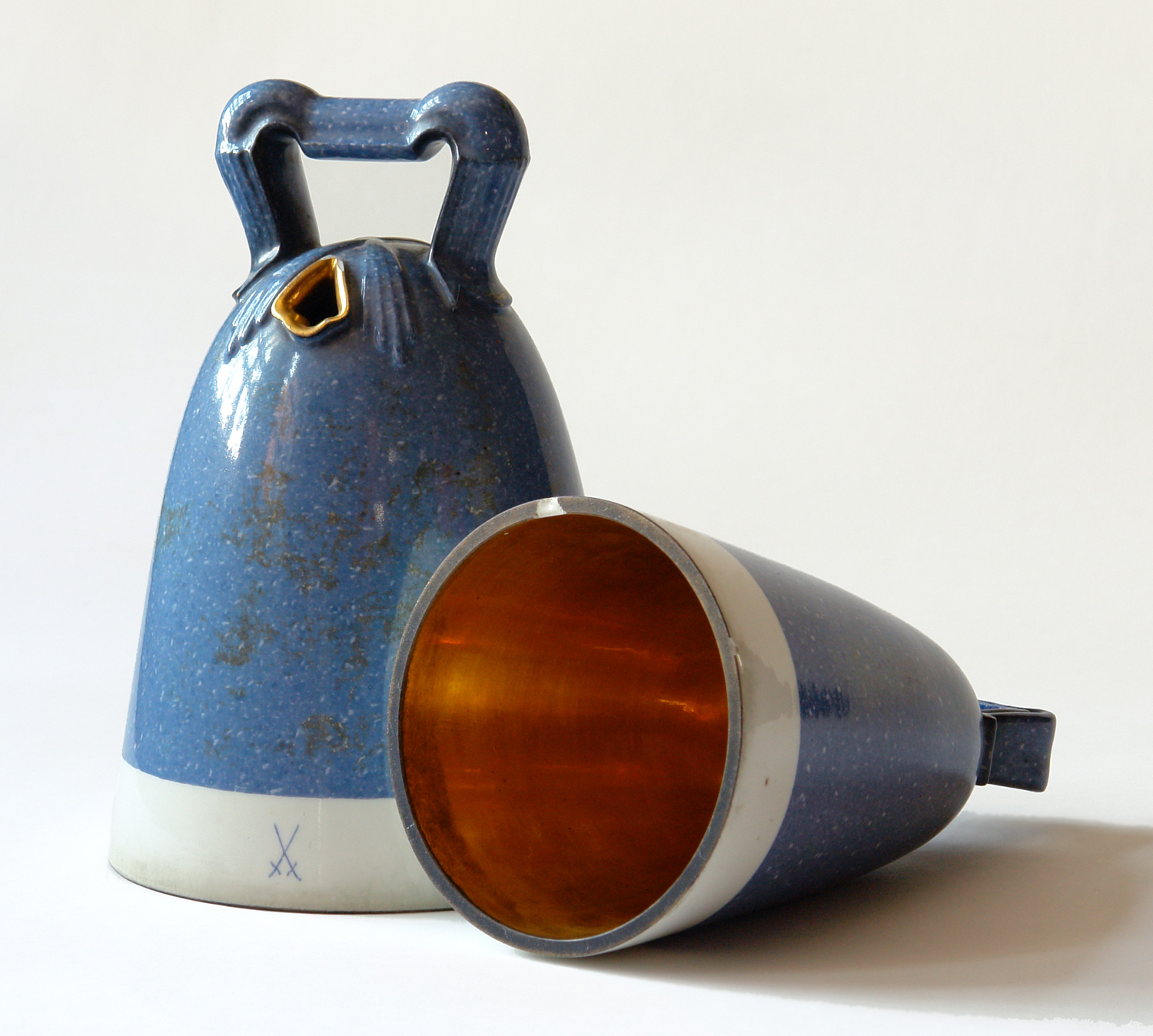
Blue bells (1934)

The building which houses the carillon is located at No. 4 Böttcherstraße in Bremen's old town district. In 1922, the two old warehouses which once stood there were converted into a new office building for the Bremen America Bank, built by coffee merchant Ludwig Roselius and designed by Bremen architects Eduard Scotland and Alfred Runge. The gabled red-brick facades of No. 4-5 were built in Neo-Renaissance style. Roselius is known today as a successful businessman who invented and was the first to market decaffeinated coffee.

The carillon of 30 Meissner porcelain bells lodged between the gables was added in 1934, maintaining a medieval tradition. Initially, the bells were painted blue on the outside and gold on the inside. As the carillon chimed, 10 coloured wooden panels come into view as they rotate inside the tower. The reliefs of famous seafarers and aviators include Christopher Columbus, Hermann Köhl, Charles Lindbergh, Count Zeppelin, and Ehrenfried Günther Freiherr von Hünefeld. The panels were designed by Bernhard Hoetger and crafted by Zdzislaus Victor Kopytko. The National Socialist Party considered Hoetger's Expressionist work degenerate but in 1937 it nevertheless listed Böttcherstraße for cultural heritage protection as an example of degenerate art.

In 1944 the building suffered serious fire damage. The carillon was replaced, this time with white porcelain bells. The panels survived the Second World War undamaged. They were restored in 1991, together with the carillon, which received a new set of white bells.

== Chiming times ==
The carillon chimes three times a day from January to March at 12 noon, 3 pm and 6 pm. The rest of the year, it chimes every hour from 12 noon to 6 pm. The bells chime for approximately 8:30 minutes.

== Panels depicting seafarers ==
The 10 panels which rotate inside the tower as the carillon chimes depict famous seafarers and aviators:

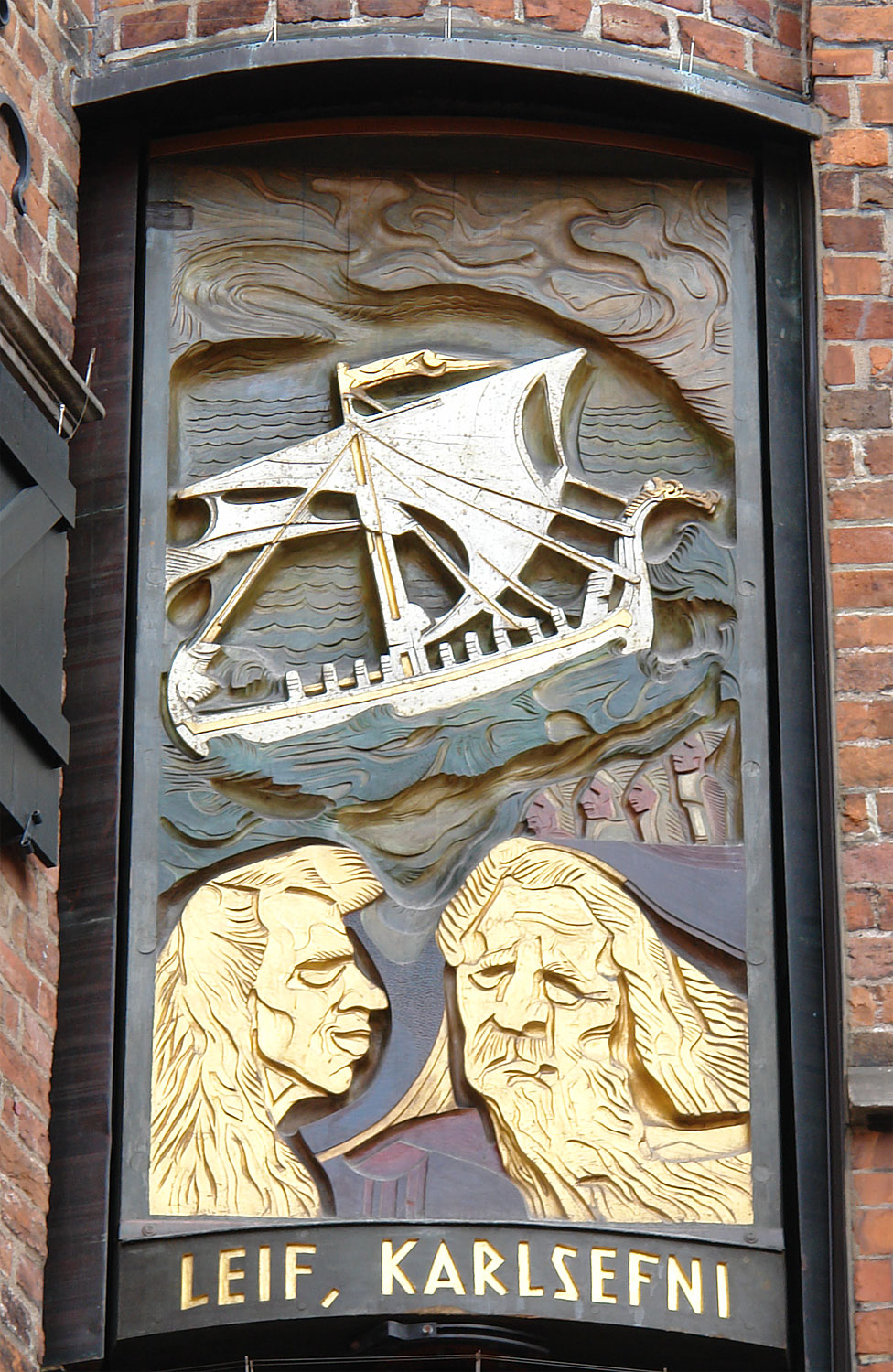
Leif, Karlsefni

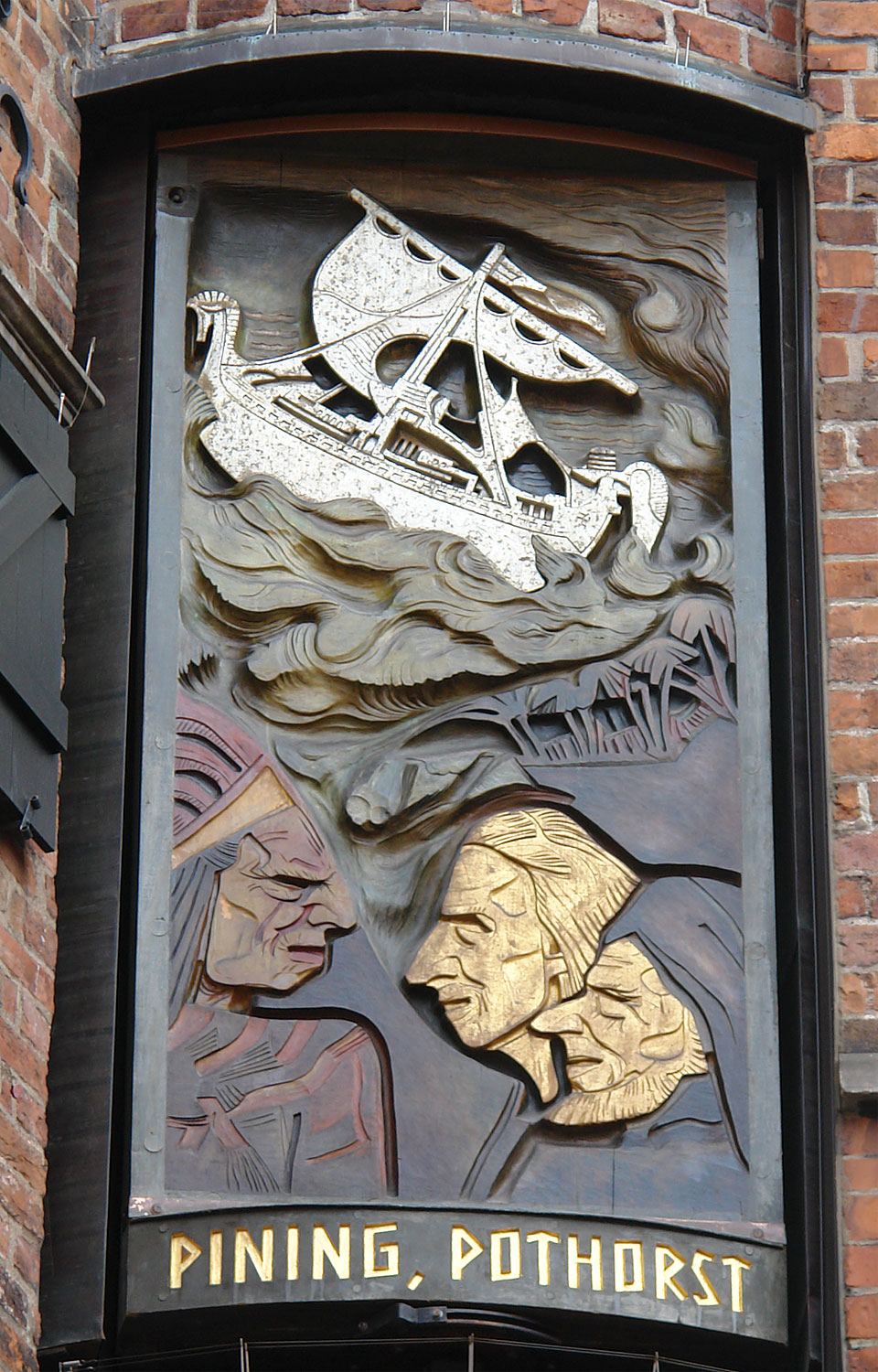
Pining, Pothorst

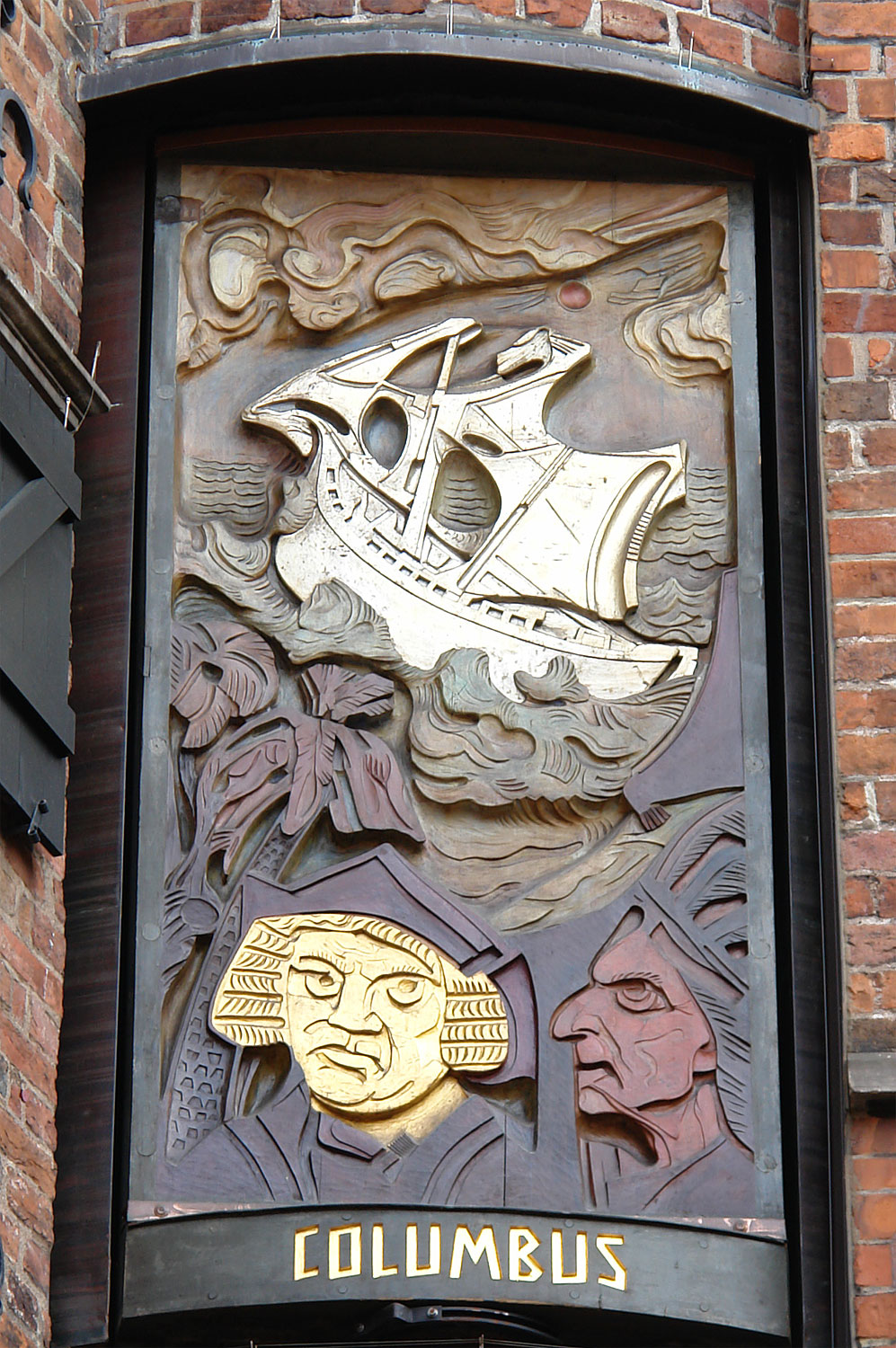
Columbus

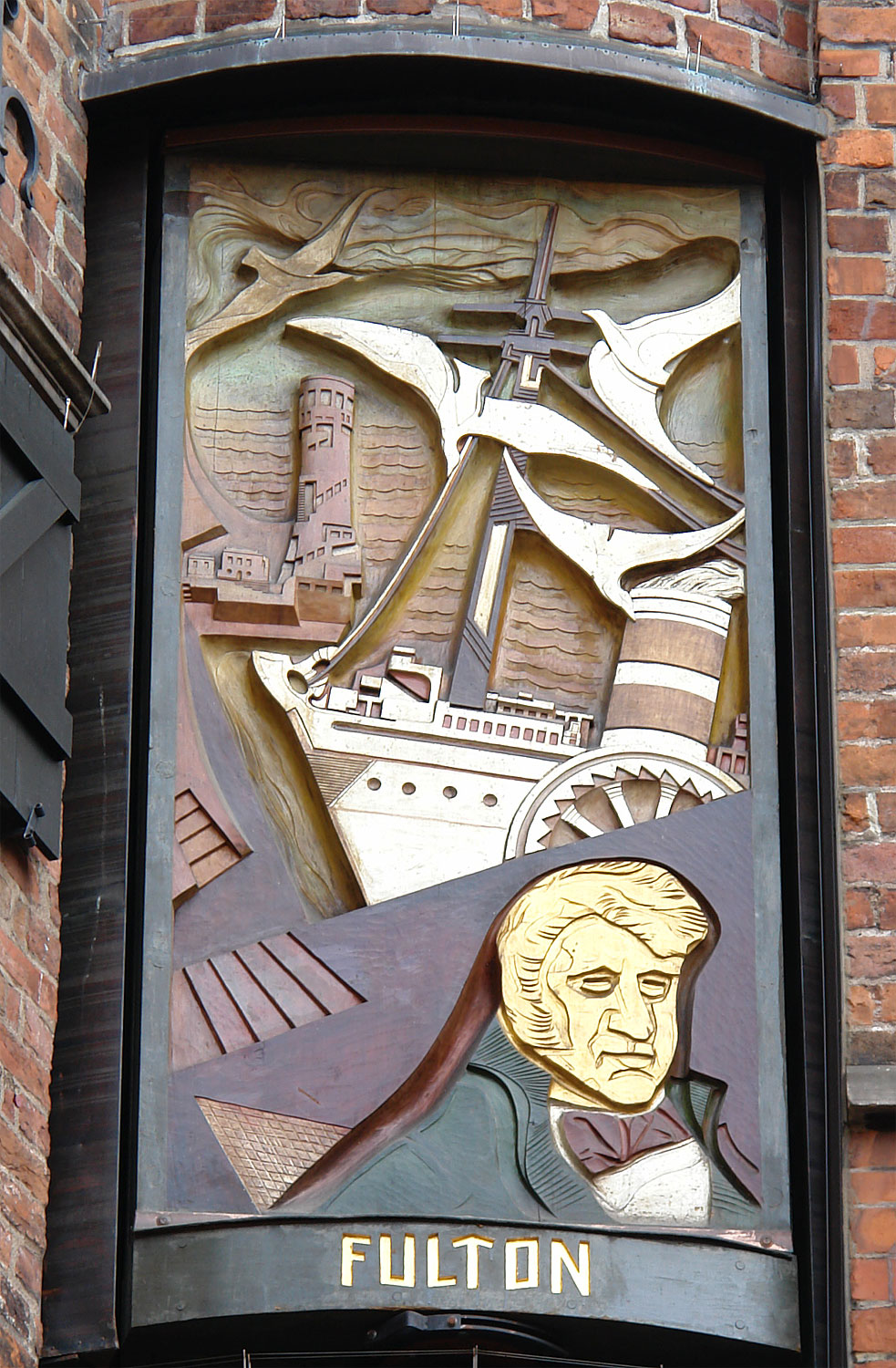
Fulton

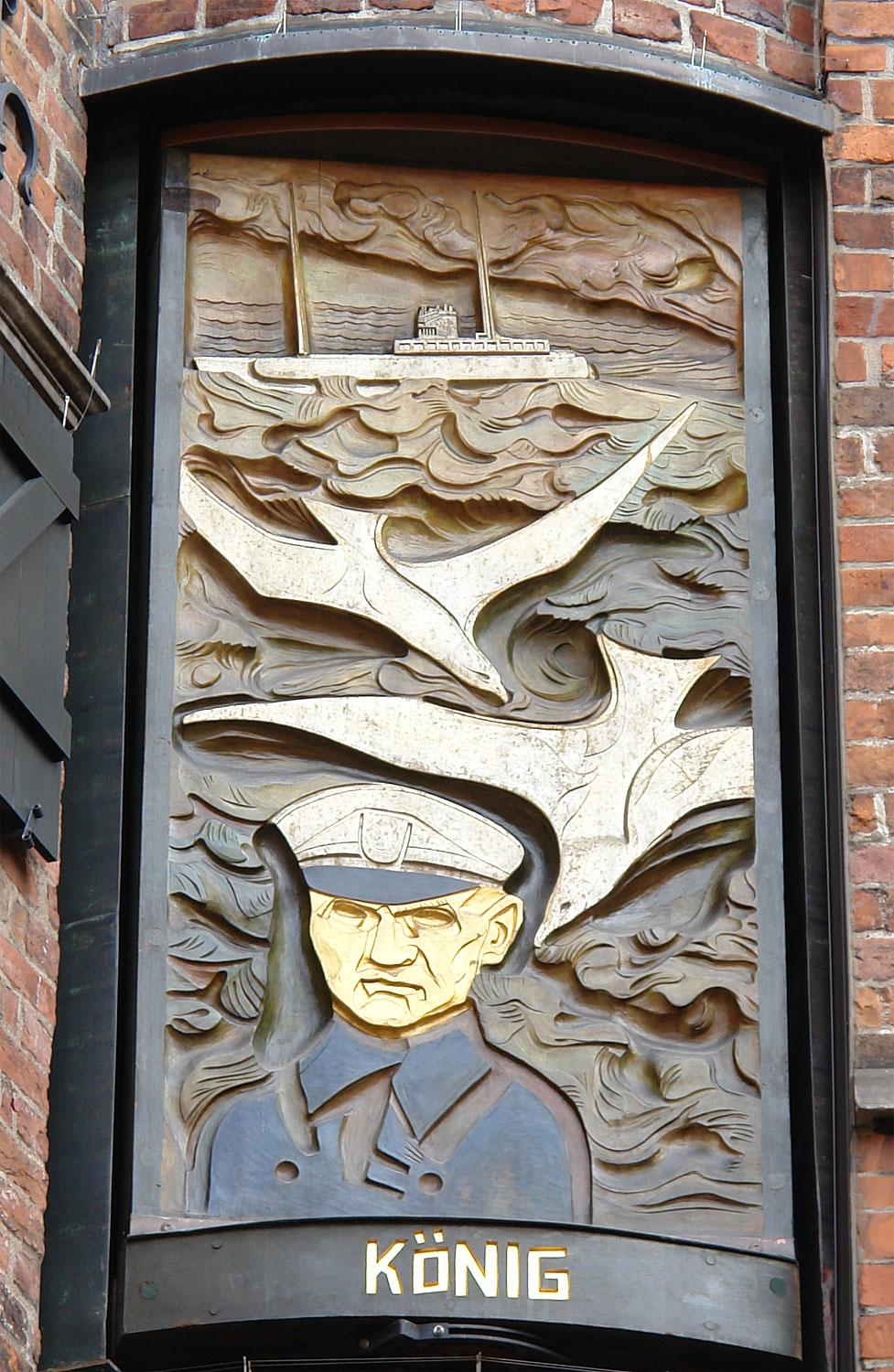
König

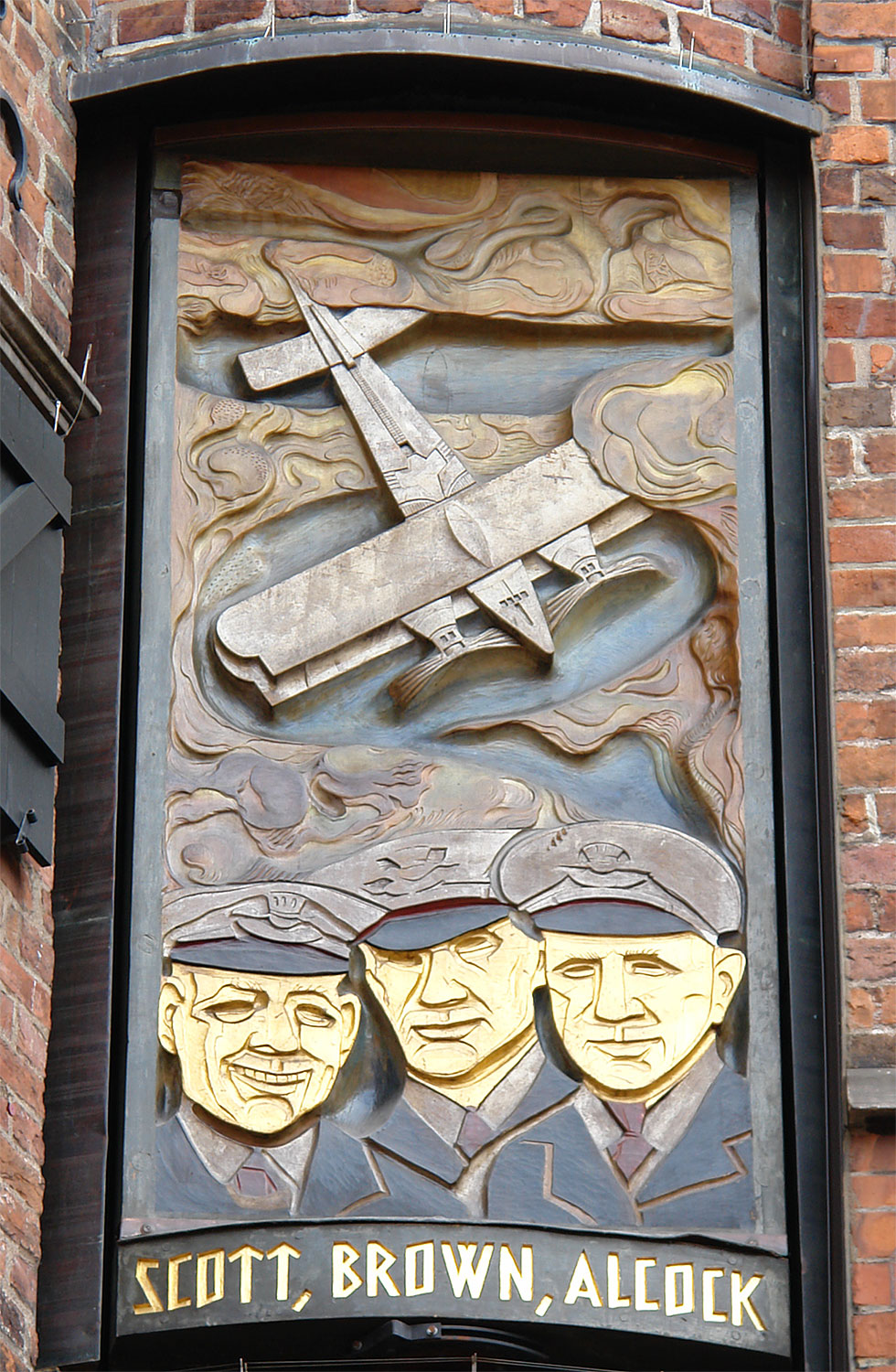
Scott, Brown, Alcock

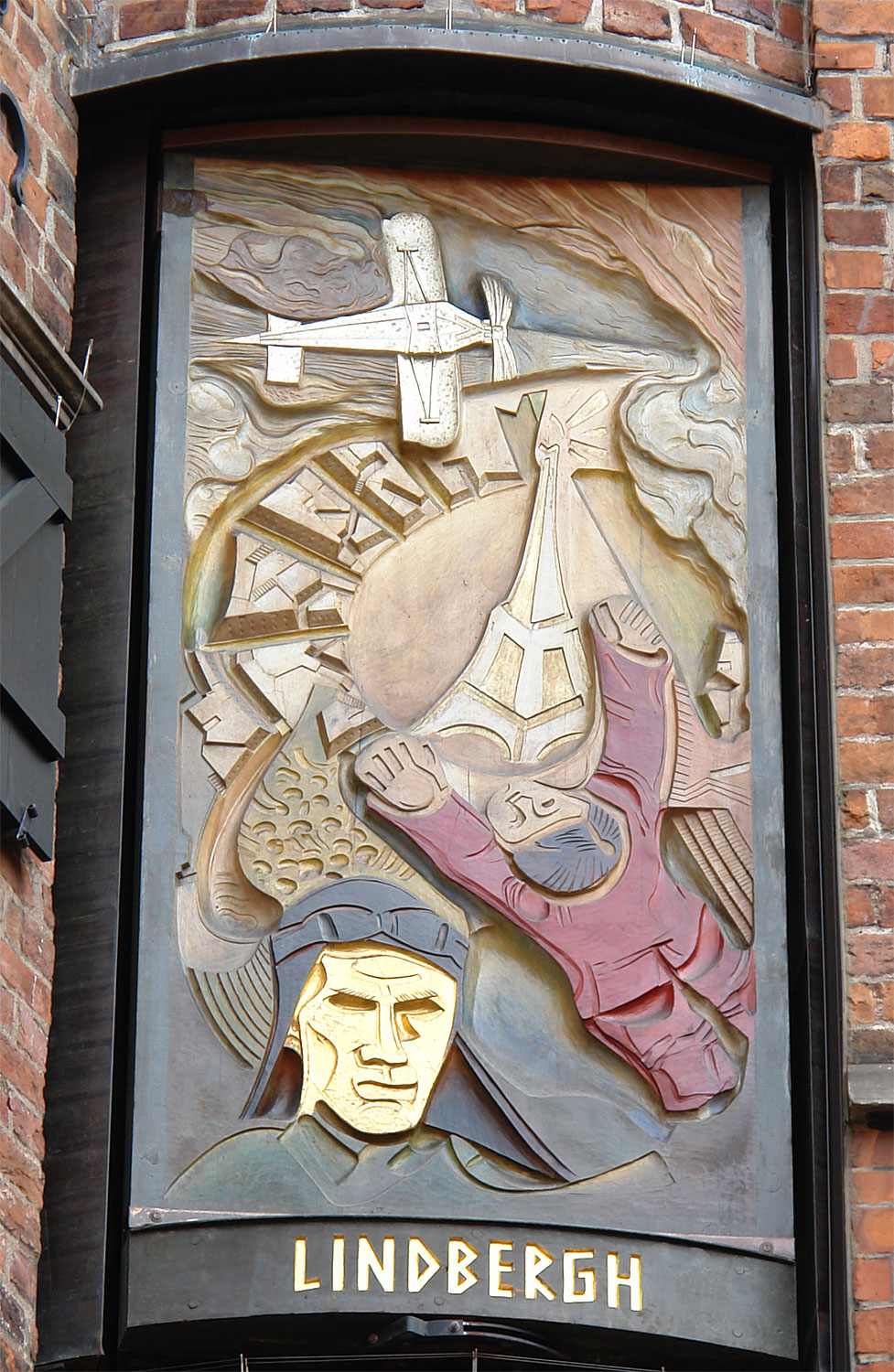
Lindbergh

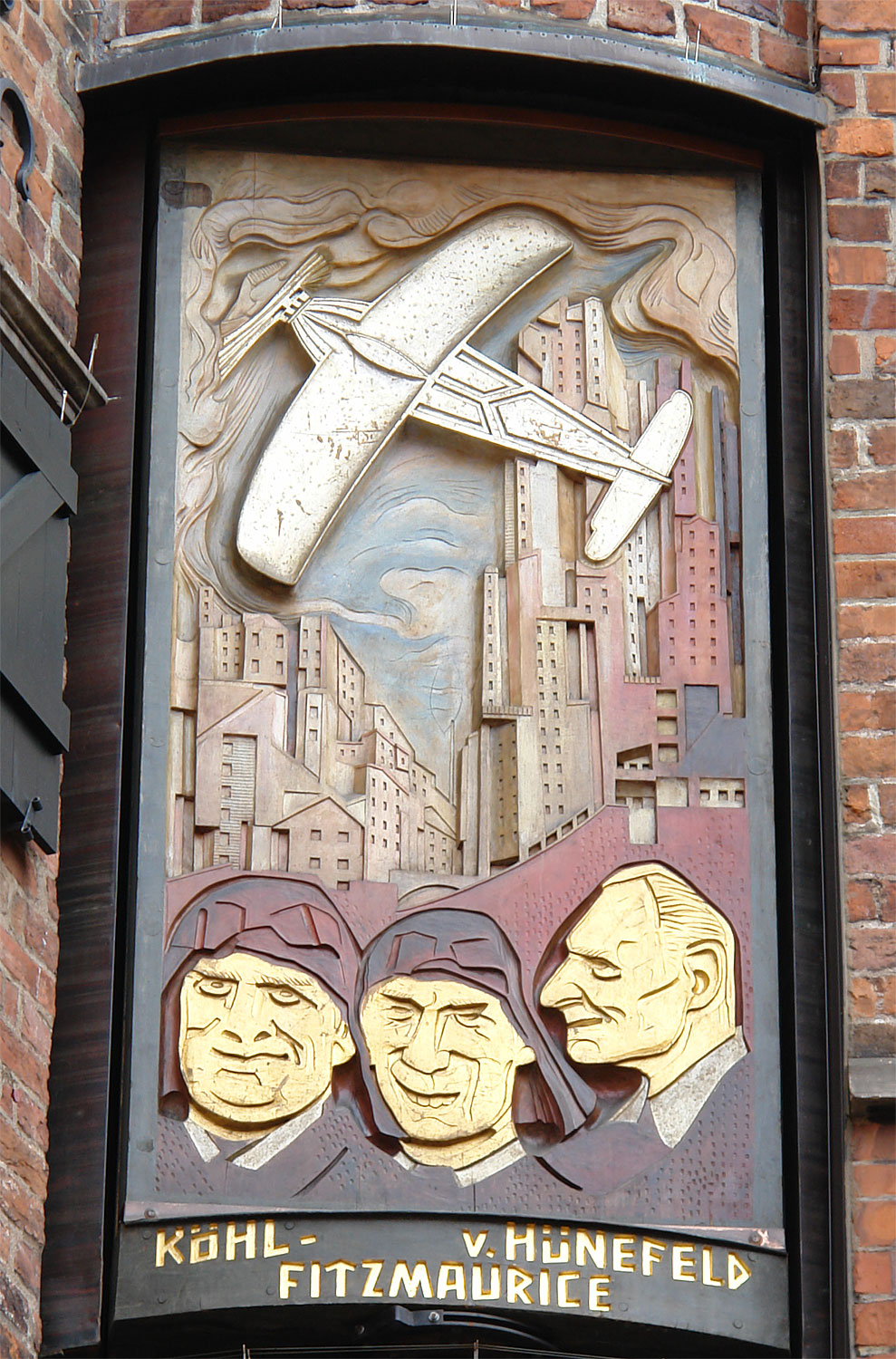
Köhl, Fitzmaurice, Hünefeldt

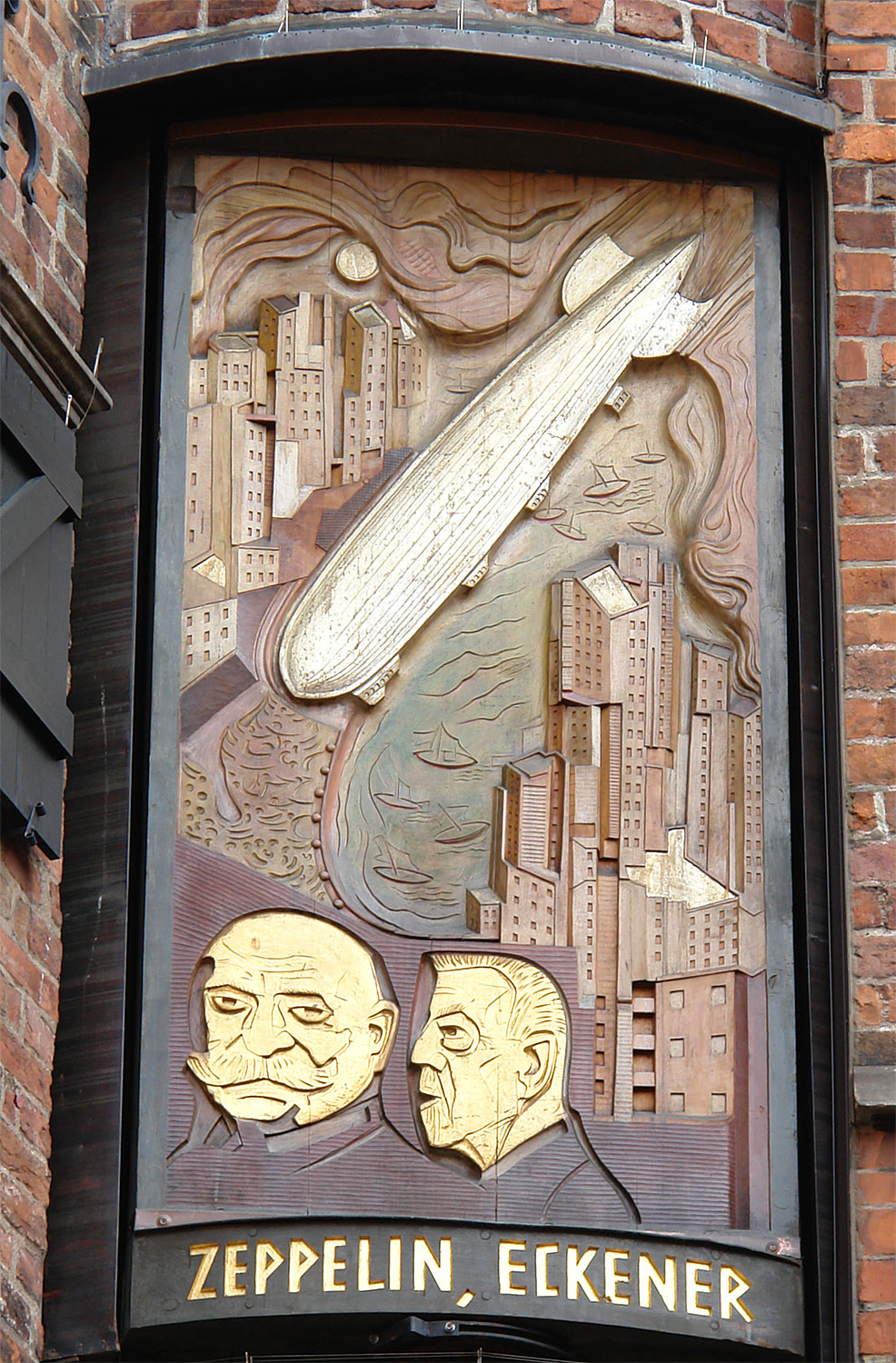
Zeppelin, Eckener

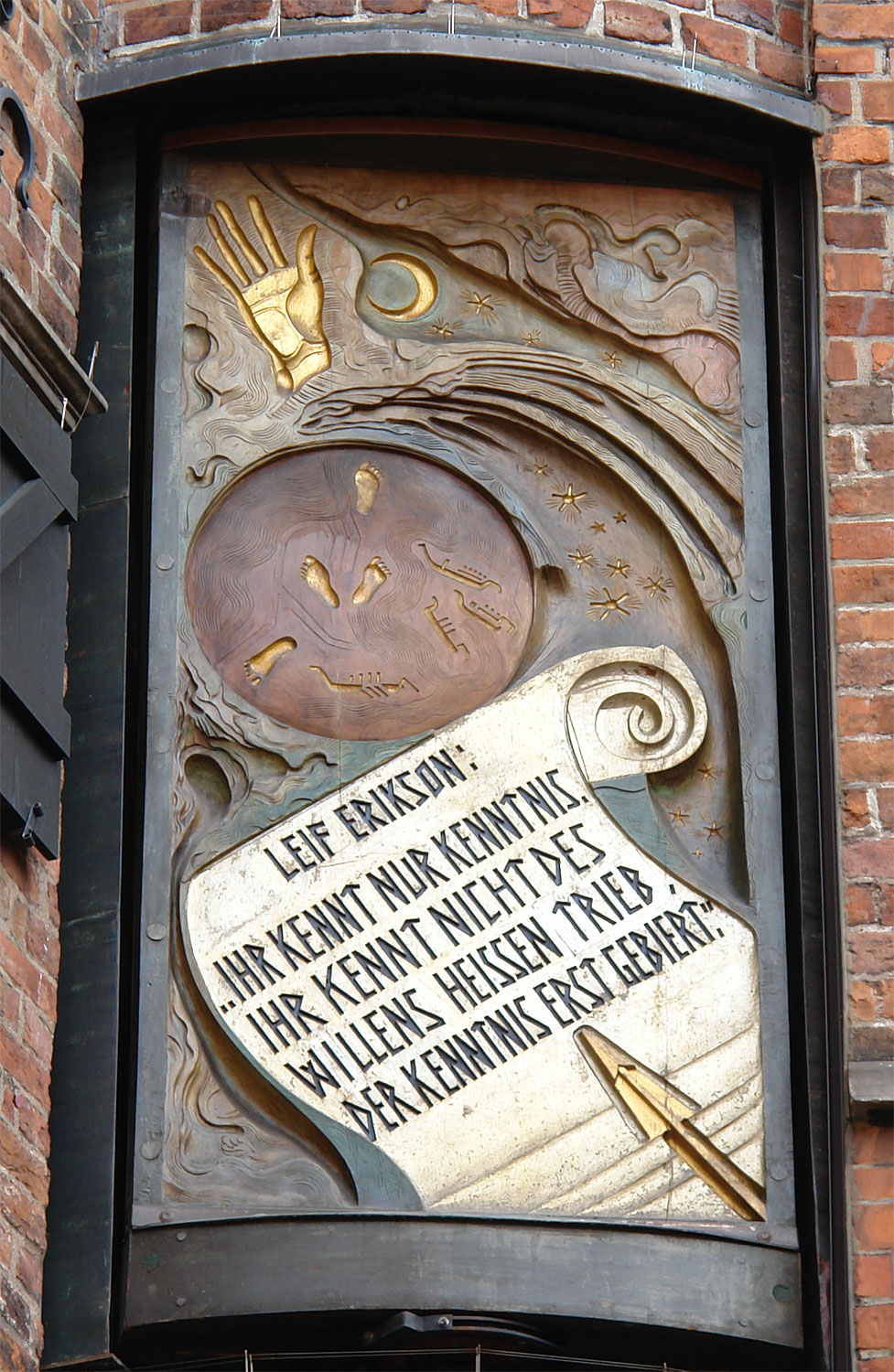
Earth, Moon, stars

== Literature ==
- Rath, Britta (2004). Bremen (in German). DuMont-Reiseverl. pp. 86–. ISBN 978-3-7701-6510-0.
- Tallasch, Hans (2002). Projekt Böttcherstrasse (in German). Aschenbeck & Holstein. ISBN 9783932292293.
