= Robinson Crusoe House =

Stepped-gabled house on Böttcherstraße in Bremen, Germany

Coordinates: 53°04′29″N 8°48′18″E

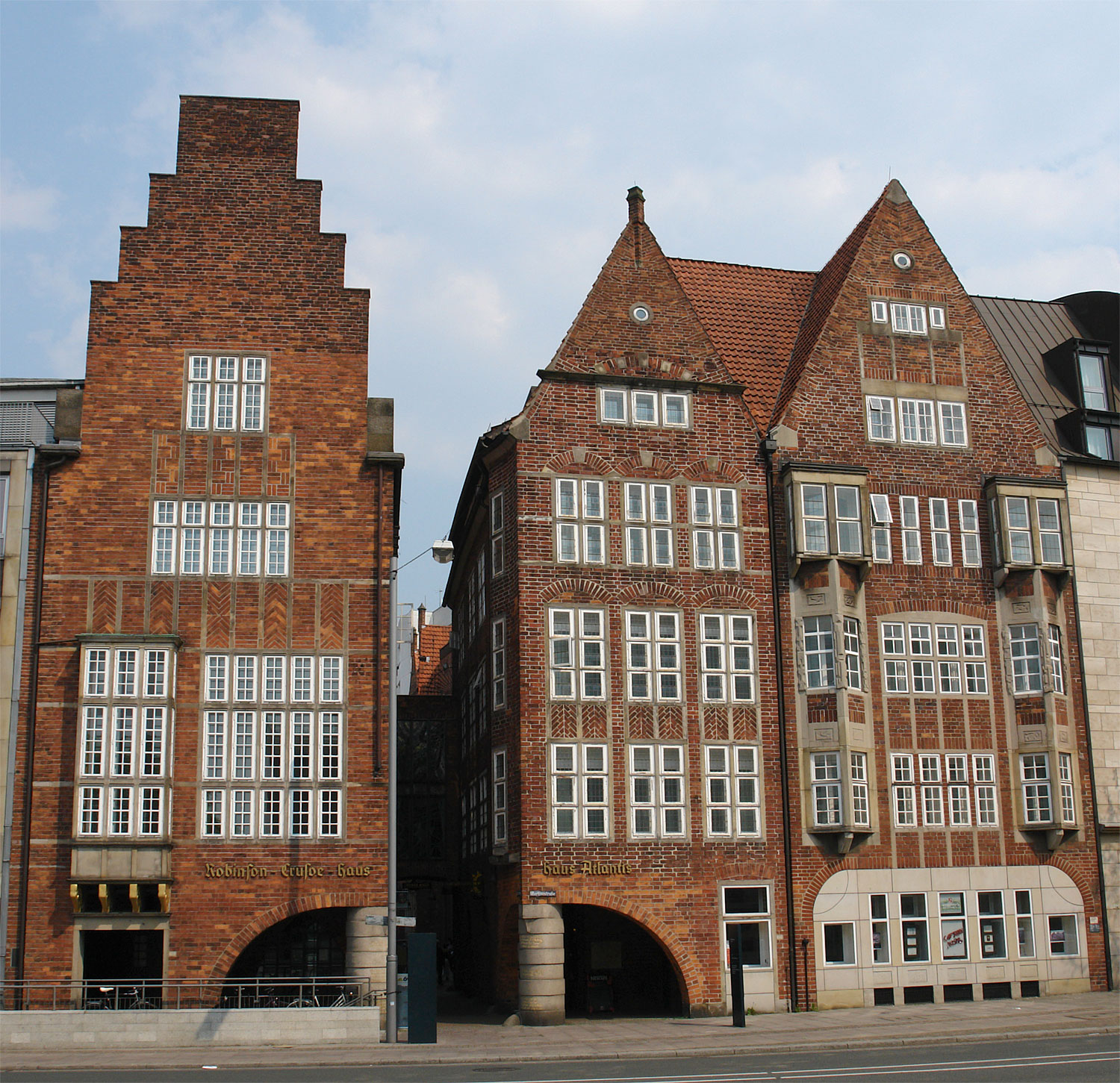
Robinson Crusoe House (on the left) and Atlantis House (right)

Robinson Crusoe House (German: Robinson-Crusoe-Haus) is a stepped-gabled house on Böttcherstraße in the old town district of Bremen, Germany. It was built by the prosperous coffee merchant Ludwig Roselius who admired the pioneering spirit of Daniel Defoe's fictional hero Robinson Crusoe.

== History and architecture ==
In 1931, the Robinson Crusoe House and the Atlantis House opposite completed the construction of buildings in Böttcherstraße. The coffee merchant Ludwig Roselius, who envisioned and financed the Böttcherstraße project, had himself proposed the design which was developed by Karl von Weihe. The interior was designed by the architects Eduard Scotland and Alfred Runge. Roselius chose the name in memory of the novel by Daniel Defoe from 1719 whose hero was the son of a Bremen merchant who had settled in York. He admired the pioneering Robinson Crusoe for his Hanseatic spirit. Roselius foresaw a rather conventional Lower Saxony brick building with a stepped gable. The house stood at the Martinistraße end of the street with a straight-gabled building on the opposite corner. A curved opening supported by a column in the lower corner of each building is a special feature.

The rooms in Robinson Crusoe House were devoted principally to the newly founded Club zu Bremen. In addition to the club room, dining room, bar, gallery and Scotland Room (Scotland Stube), there was also a Vogeler Room (Vogeler Saal) on the second floor with nine paintings showing the artistic evolution of the painter Heinrich Vogeler.

In 1944, the house was destroyed by bombing but was rebuilt in 1954. None of the original decorations remain but today there are carved panels in the stairway representing scenes from the story of Robinson Crusoe crafted by Theodor Schultz-Walbaum.

Located on the outside of the Robin Crusoe House are two sculptures from Bernhard Hoetger called "Panther carrying the Night (1912)" and "Puma carrying the Day (1912)".

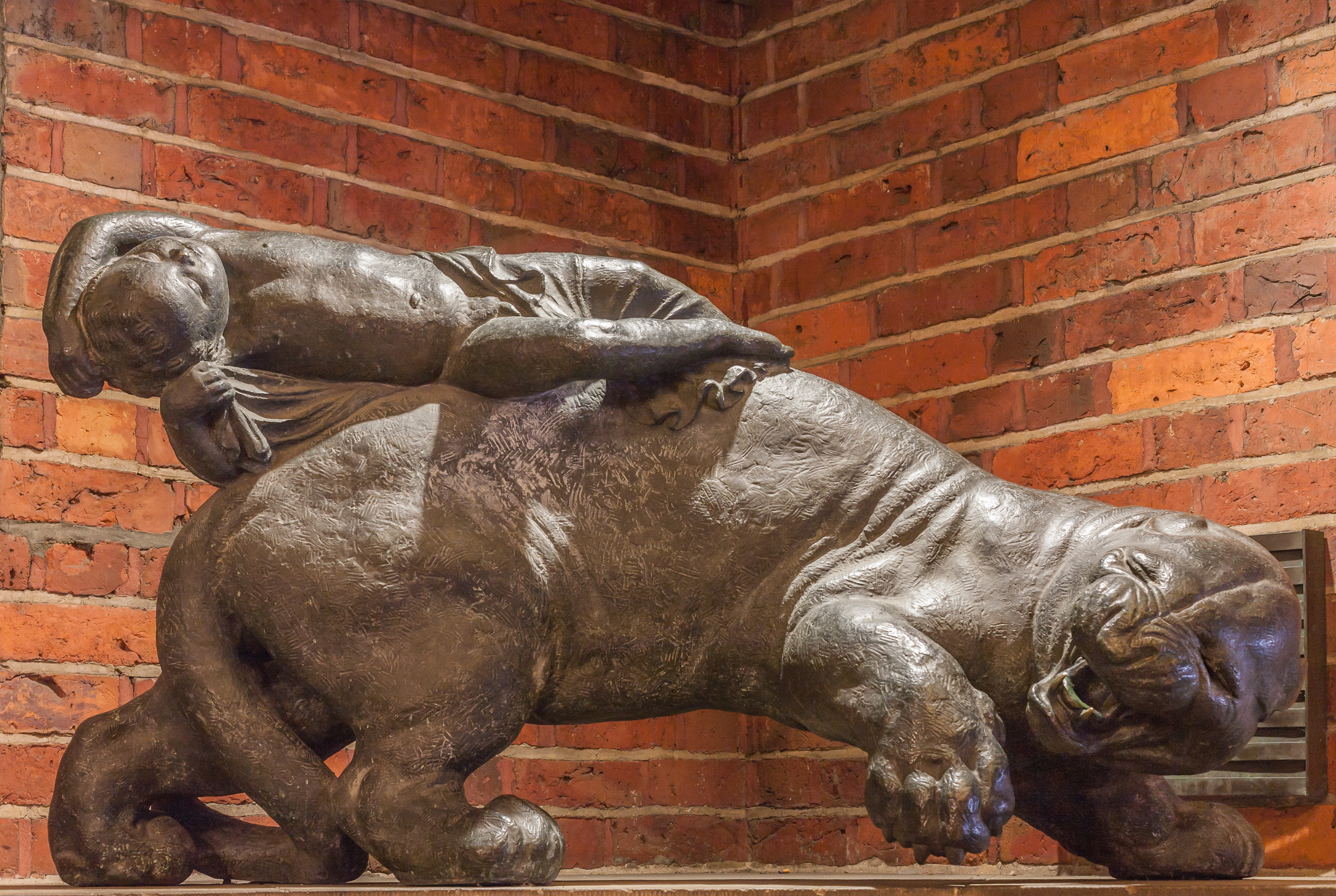
Panther carrying the Night

== Crusoe Hall ==
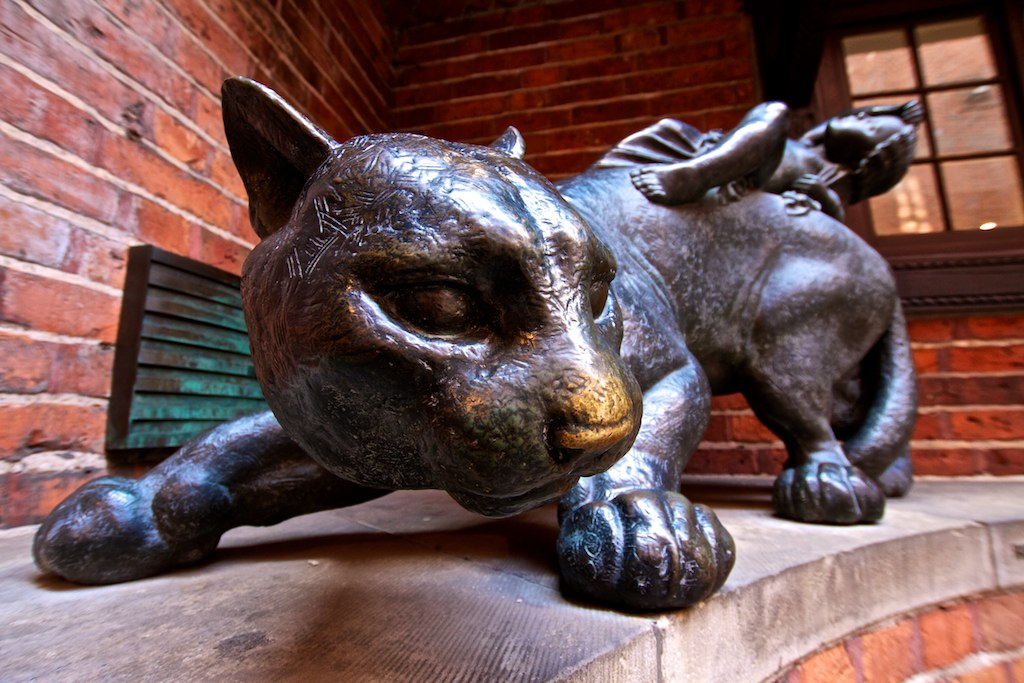
The cat sculpture sits above the sea water aquarium outside the house

The building's Crusoe Hall (Crusoe Halle) is used as an exhibition room by the Bremen Artisans Association (Angewandte Kunst Bremen) in collaboration with the two Böttcherstraße museums, Paula Modersohn-Becker Museum and Ludwig Roselius Museum. A new exhibition is featured each month. From October every year, the hall houses the traditional Weihnachtsmarkt or Christmas market.
