= St Petrus House =

Historic building in Bremen, Germany

Coordinates: 53°04′30″N 8°48′20″E

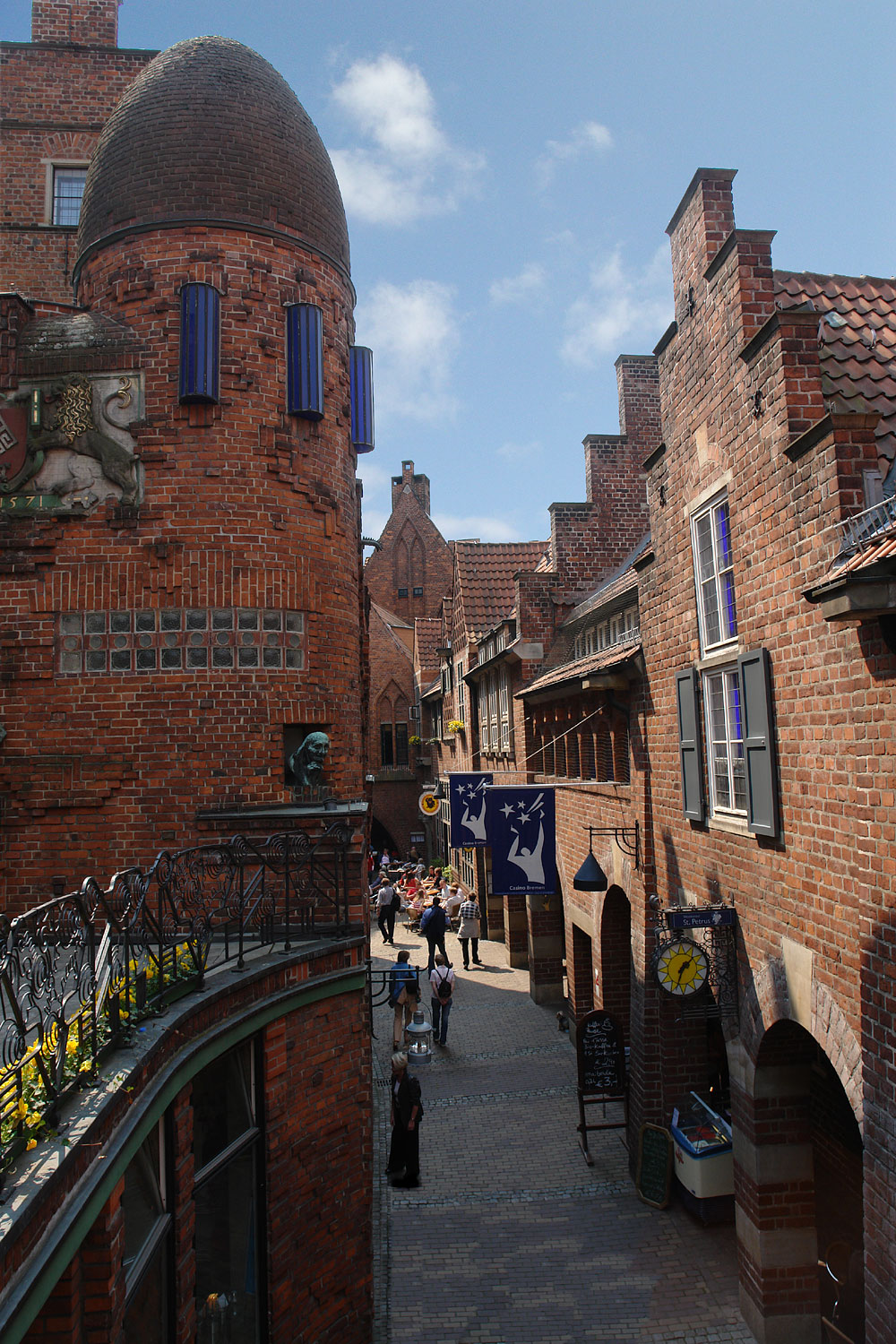
St Petrus House (right) from the Paula Modersohn-Becker Museum (left)

St Petrus House (German: Haus St. Petrus) is a historic building in Bremen, Germany. With features of North-German Gothic architecture including an arcade, it was built in 1927 by the prosperous coffee merchant Ludwig Roselius as part of his development of Böttcherstraße. Today, its newly refurbished dining rooms are part of the Atlantic Grand Hotel. Since 1973, St Petrus House has been a listed building.

== History and architecture ==
In 1924, Ludwig Roselius acquired a lease for a period of 60 years on the land on Böttcherstrasse covering No. 15-19 and later also obtained permission to develop the old packhouses at No. 4-5. He persuaded the authorities to let him build a small colony of shops, studios and apartments there, drawing on North German architectural styles. Roselius commissioned the architects Eduard Scotland and Alfred Runge who achieved the required historic Gothic style by making use of dormers, stepped gables and arcades.

The complex was first known as Haus HAG (after Roselius' company: Handels-Aktien-Gesellschaft) but the part south of the stepped gable later came to be known as Haus St. Petrus. The building was divided into several sections: the storehouse with a projecting arched entrance, a club house with rooms for members of the Bremen Association of 1914, and a restaurant area.

== Recent developments ==
For some 30 years, St Petrus House was home to the Bremen casino until it moved to the Schlachte in 2010. Over the years, the building had also been used as a venue for wedding receptions, confirmation parties and anniversaries. In 2011, the Atlantic Grand Hotel undertook substantial refurbishment, combining modernization with the building's history. The white-panelled Scotland Hall was extended to the balcony overlooking the inner courtyard facing the Chamber of Commerce while the other rooms were fitted out for presentations, business meetings and celebrations, with an overall seating capacity of 500. The smallest room the Zelt (tent)—with a canopy hanging from the ceiling and red chairs matching the first floor lobby—has tables for up to 16 guests. Once known for its roulette tables, the Golden Hall extending over 200 m^{2} (2,200 sq ft), now has a parquet floor, walls with dark-brown panels topped with gold-tinted wallpaper, and golden chandeliers.

Since 1999, the building has also housed the Weinkontor St. Petrus restaurant.

== Decorations ==
External decorations include details by Engelhard Tölken, the arms of Bremen (1608), a statue of Petrus (Peter, 1954) by Irmgard Roselius, and Paracelsus Head (1936) by Bernhard Hoetger.

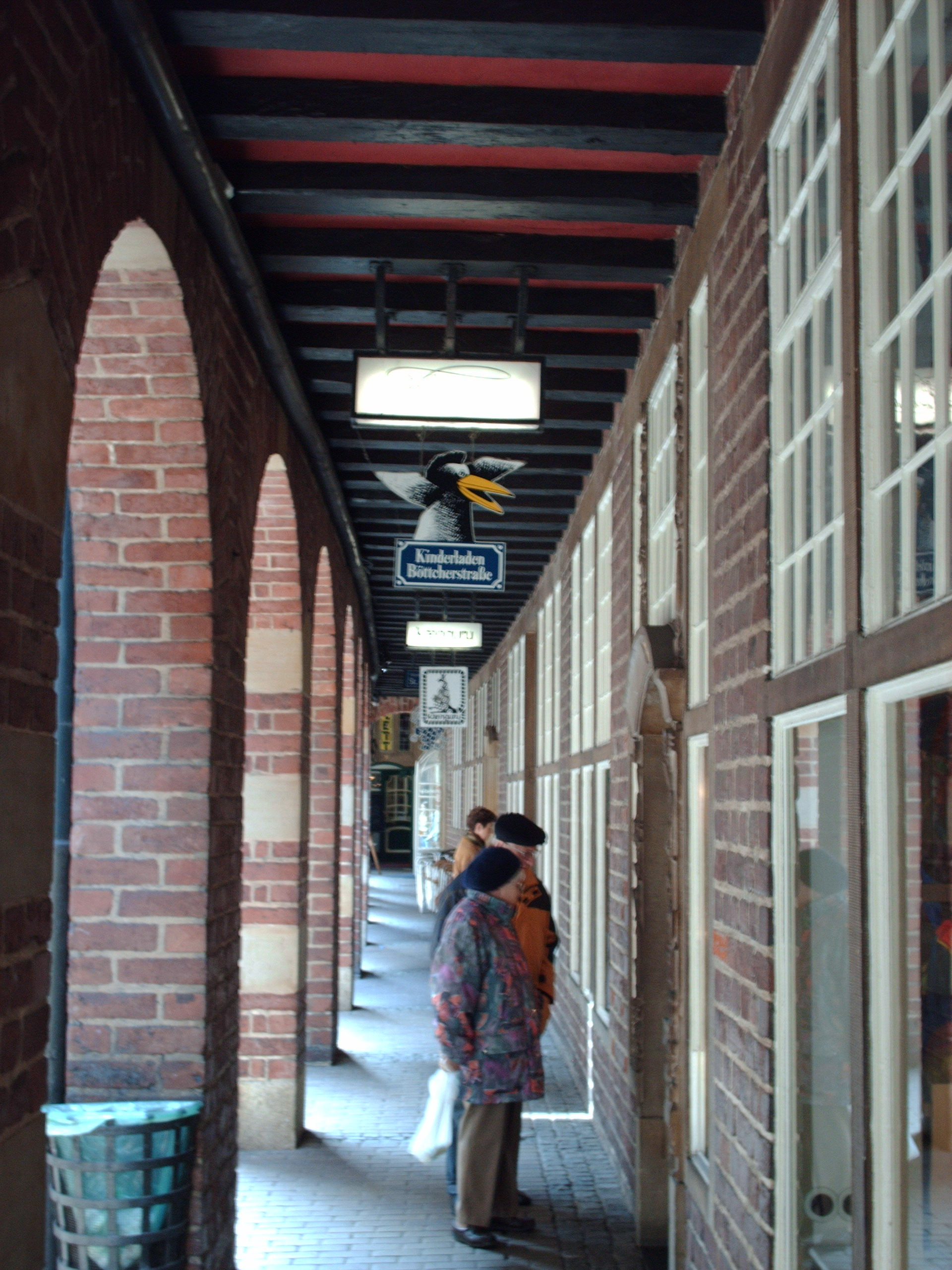
Arcade

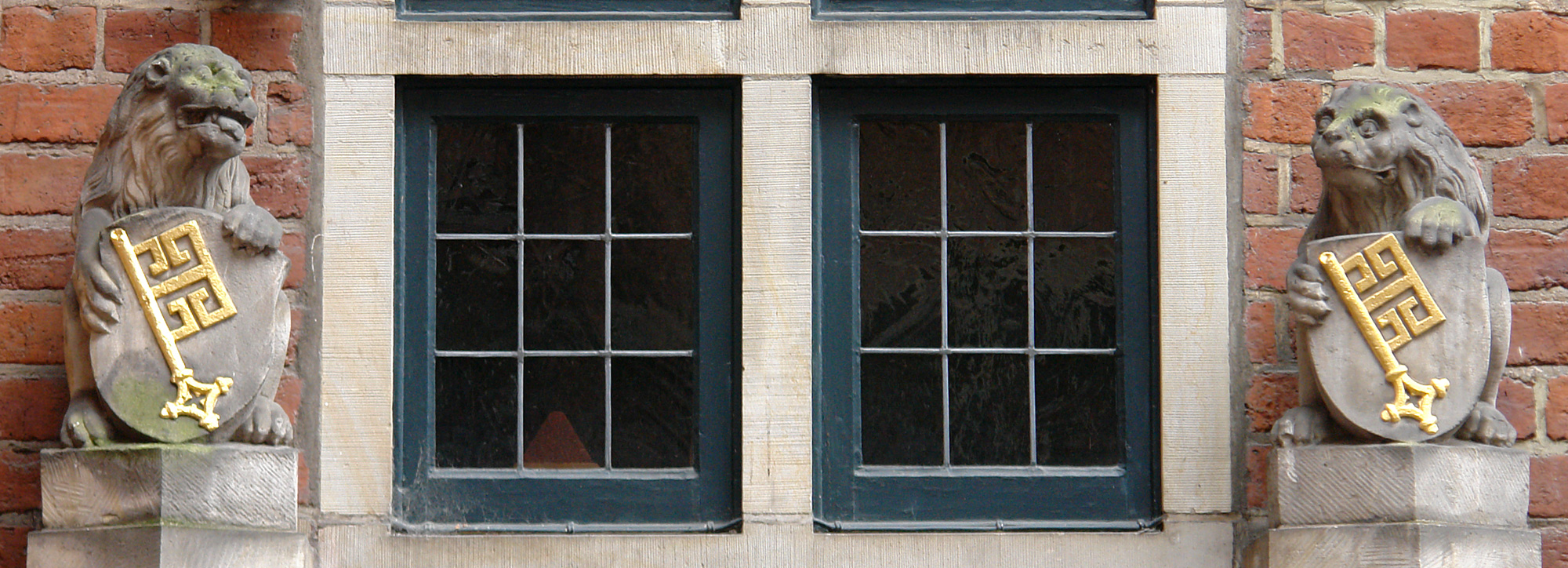
Bremen lions

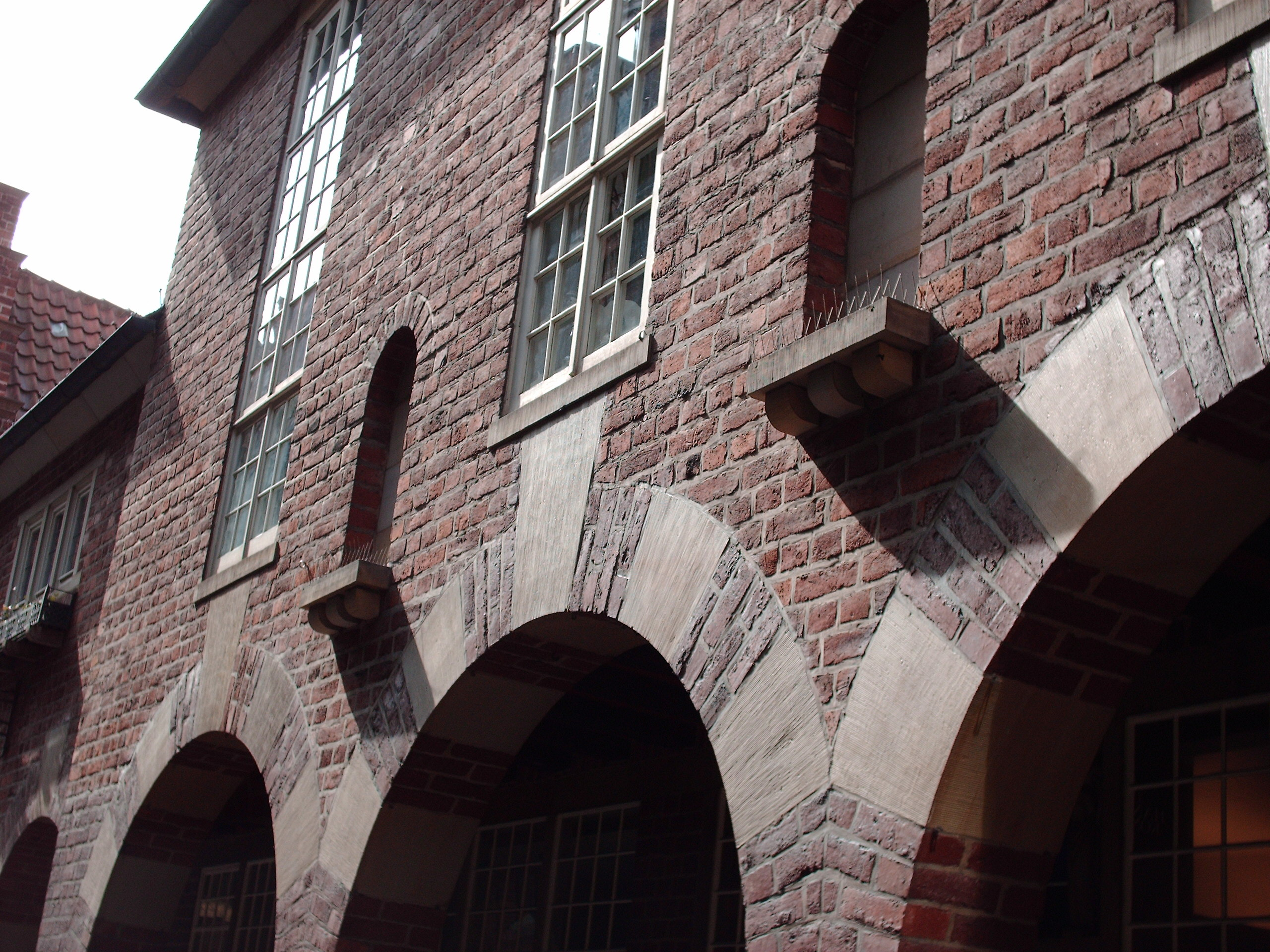
Rounded arches

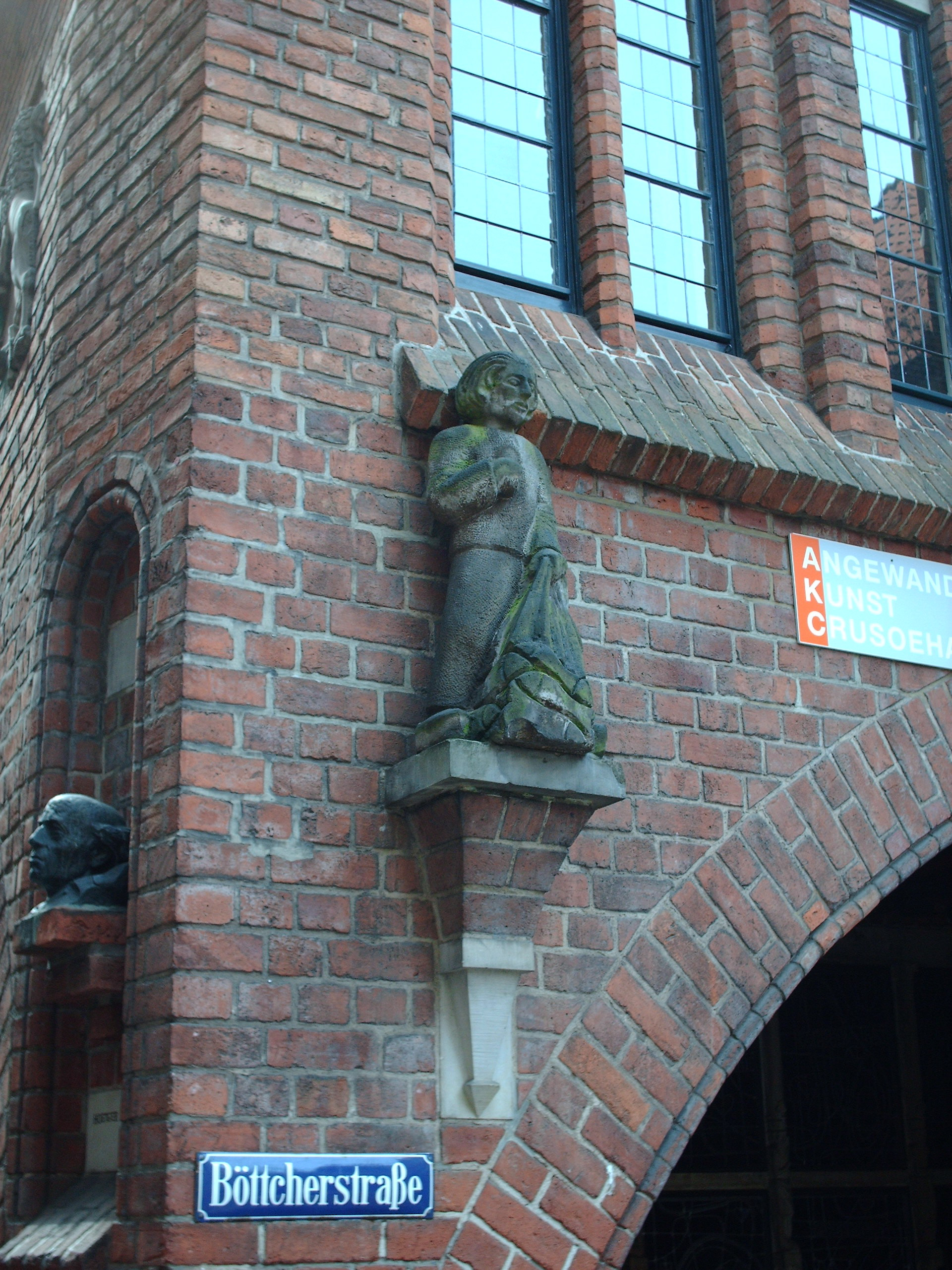
Petrus statue

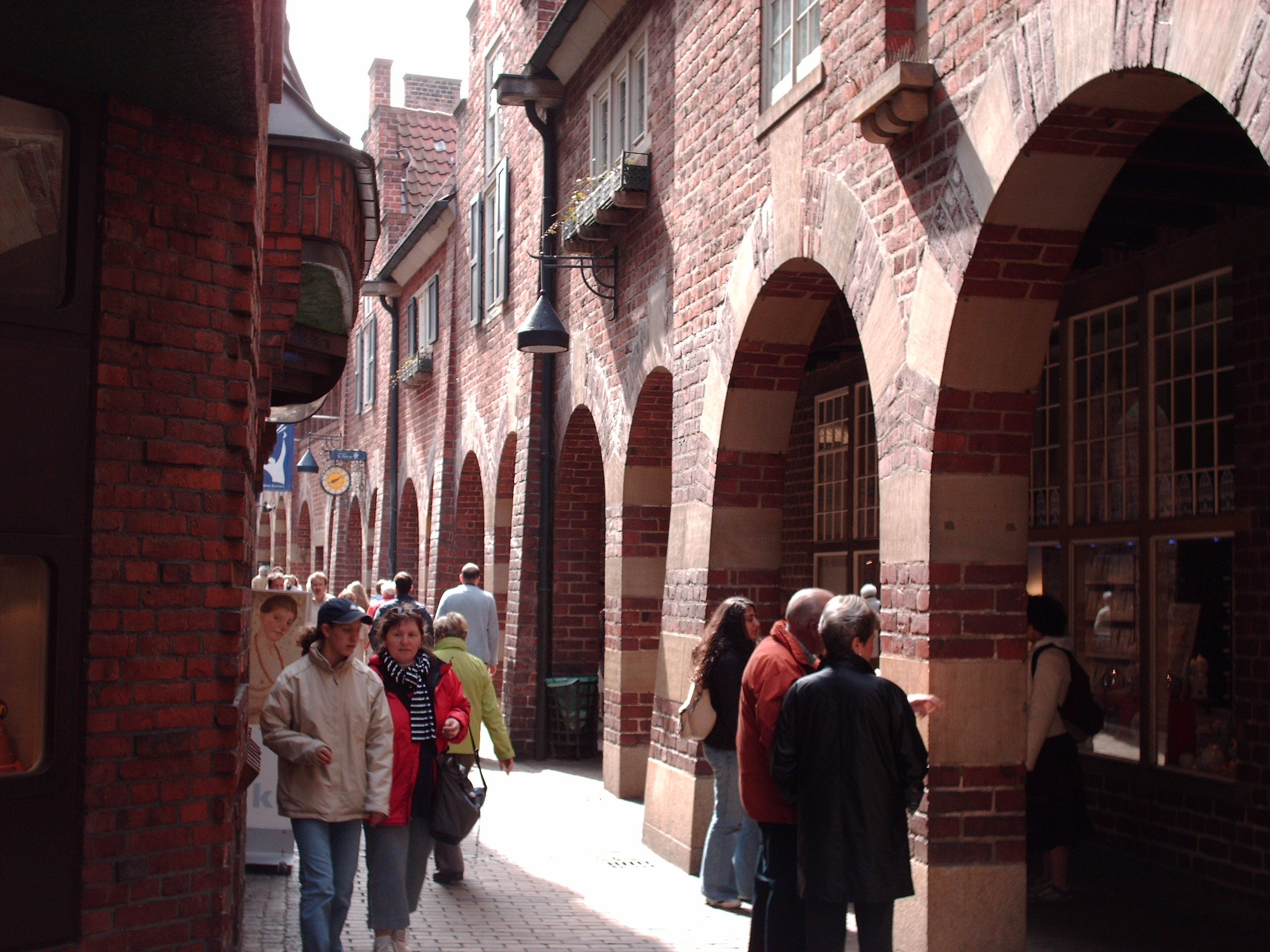
Arcades

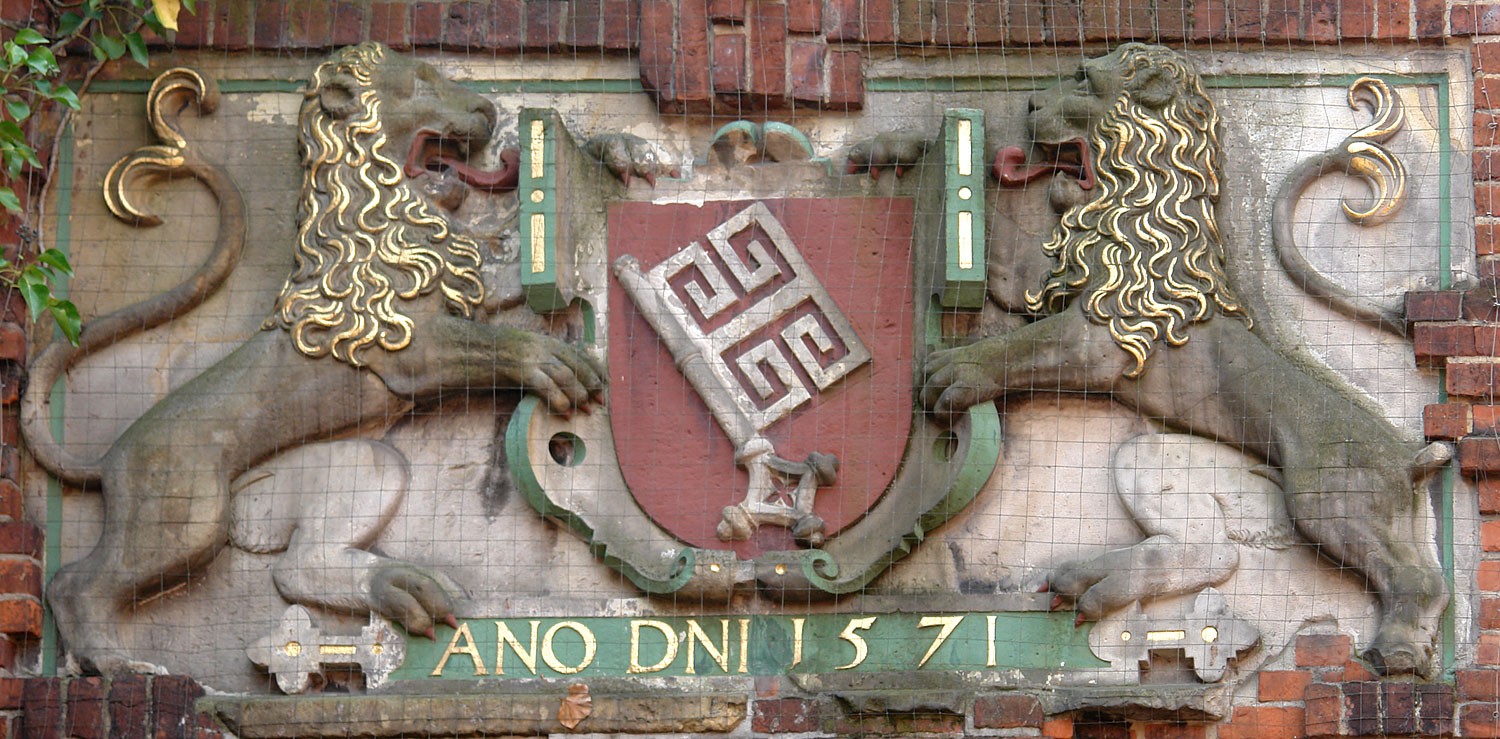
Arms of Bremen

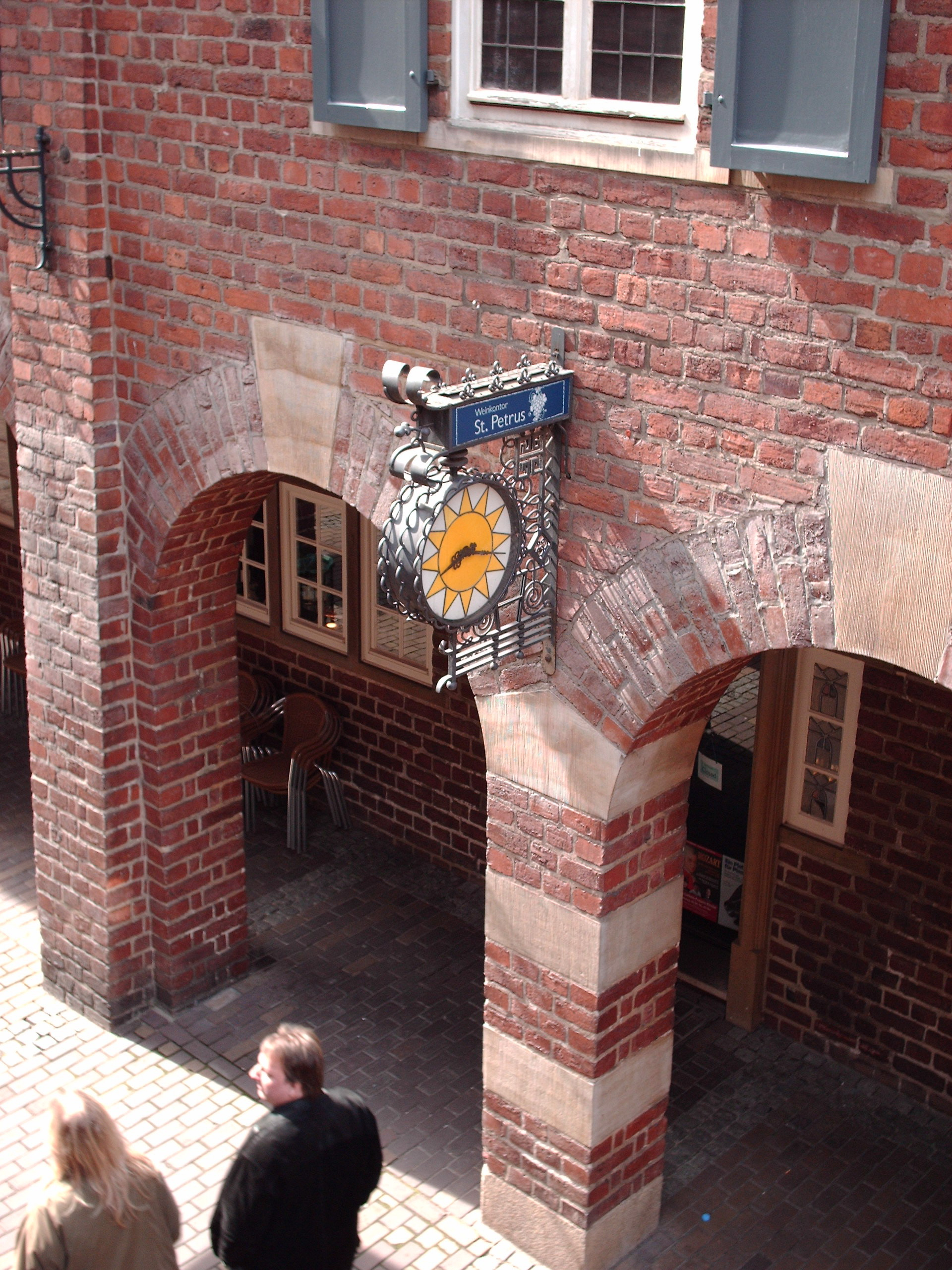
Weinhaus St. Petrus
