= Aloys Röhr =

German Expressionist sculptor

- Born: 18 December 1887; Munster
- Died: 1 March 1953 (aged 65); Albersloh

Aloys Röhr (18 December 1887 – 1 March 1953) was a German Expressionist sculptor.

== Life ==
Röhr was born in Münster in 1887. He was eldest of the six children of Carl Albert and Gertrud Rohr. He trained as a sculptor in Munster, where he worked for over thirty years.

Röhr died in Albersloh in 1953.
