= Café HAG =

Brand of decaffeinated coffee

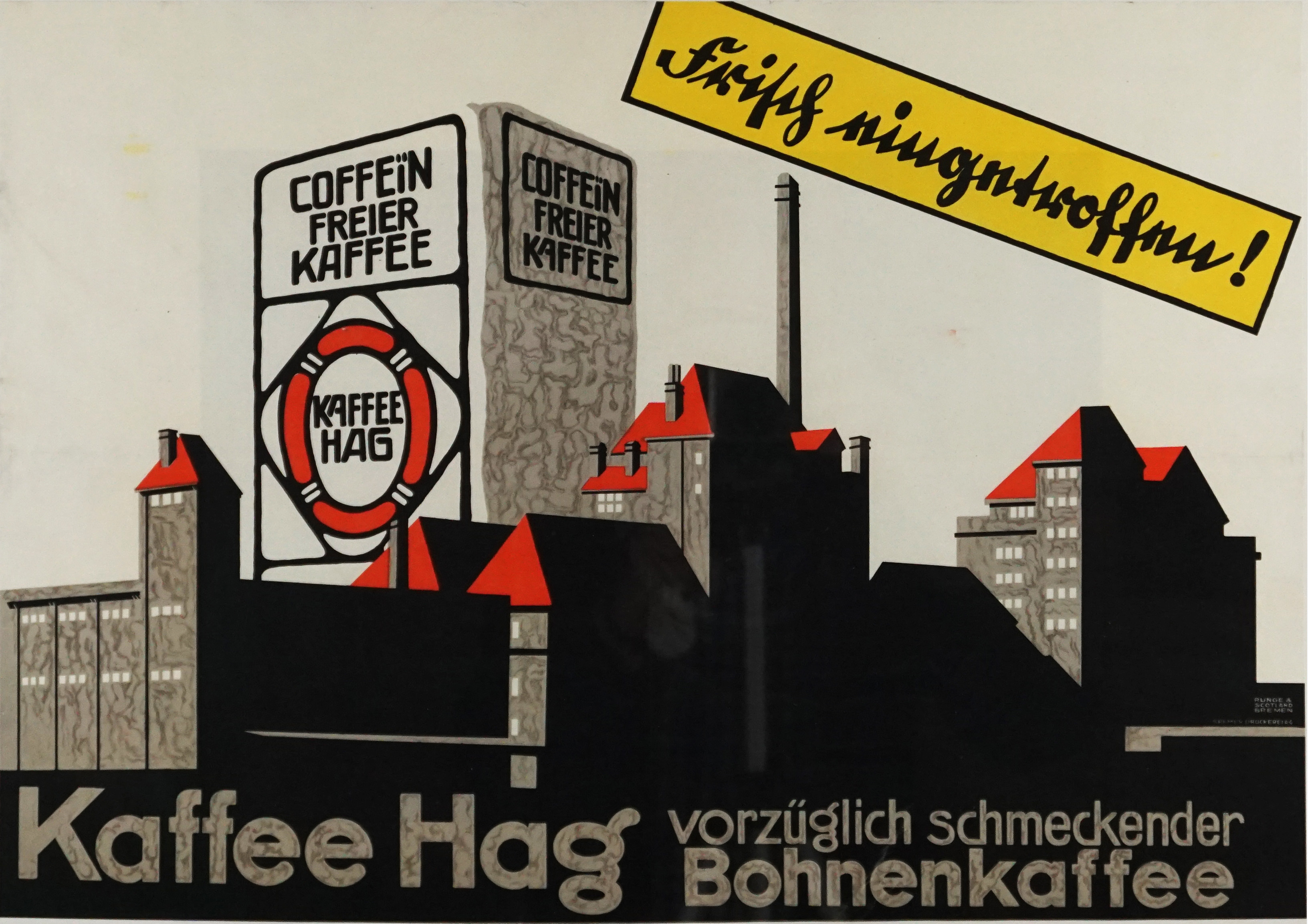
Ad by Alfred Runge & Eduard Scotland (1911)

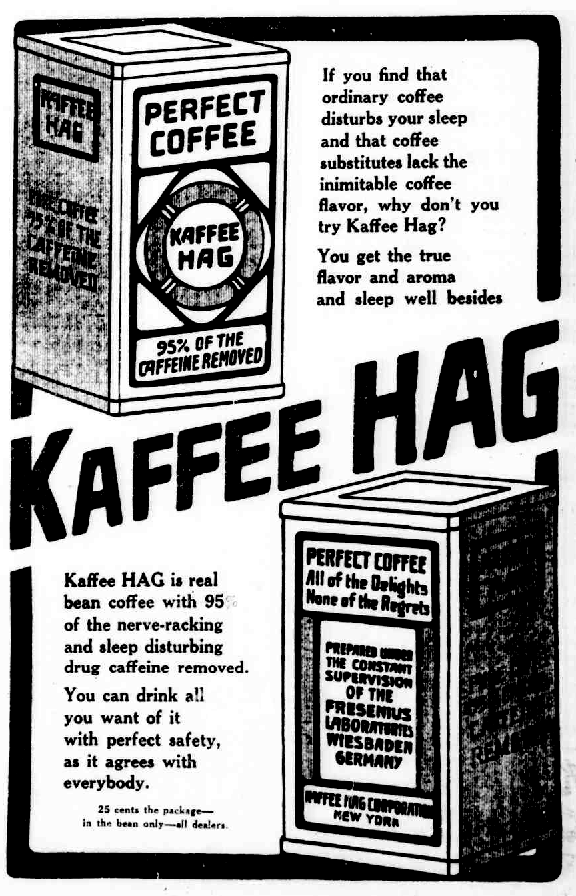
1914 American newspaper ad for Kaffee HAG

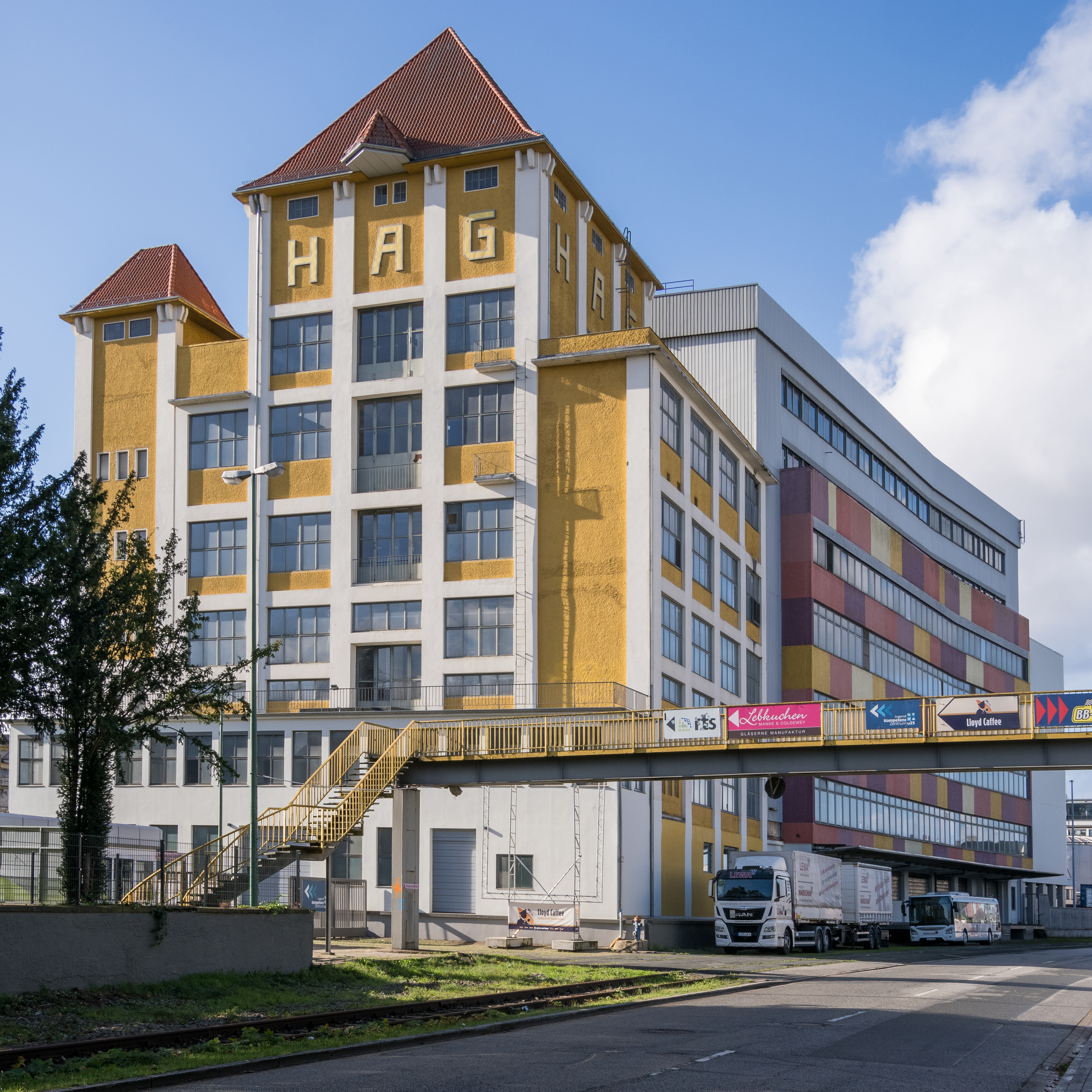
Café Hag, Plant I in Bremen (2023)

Café HAG is a worldwide brand of decaffeinated coffee currently owned by JDE Peet's.

== History ==
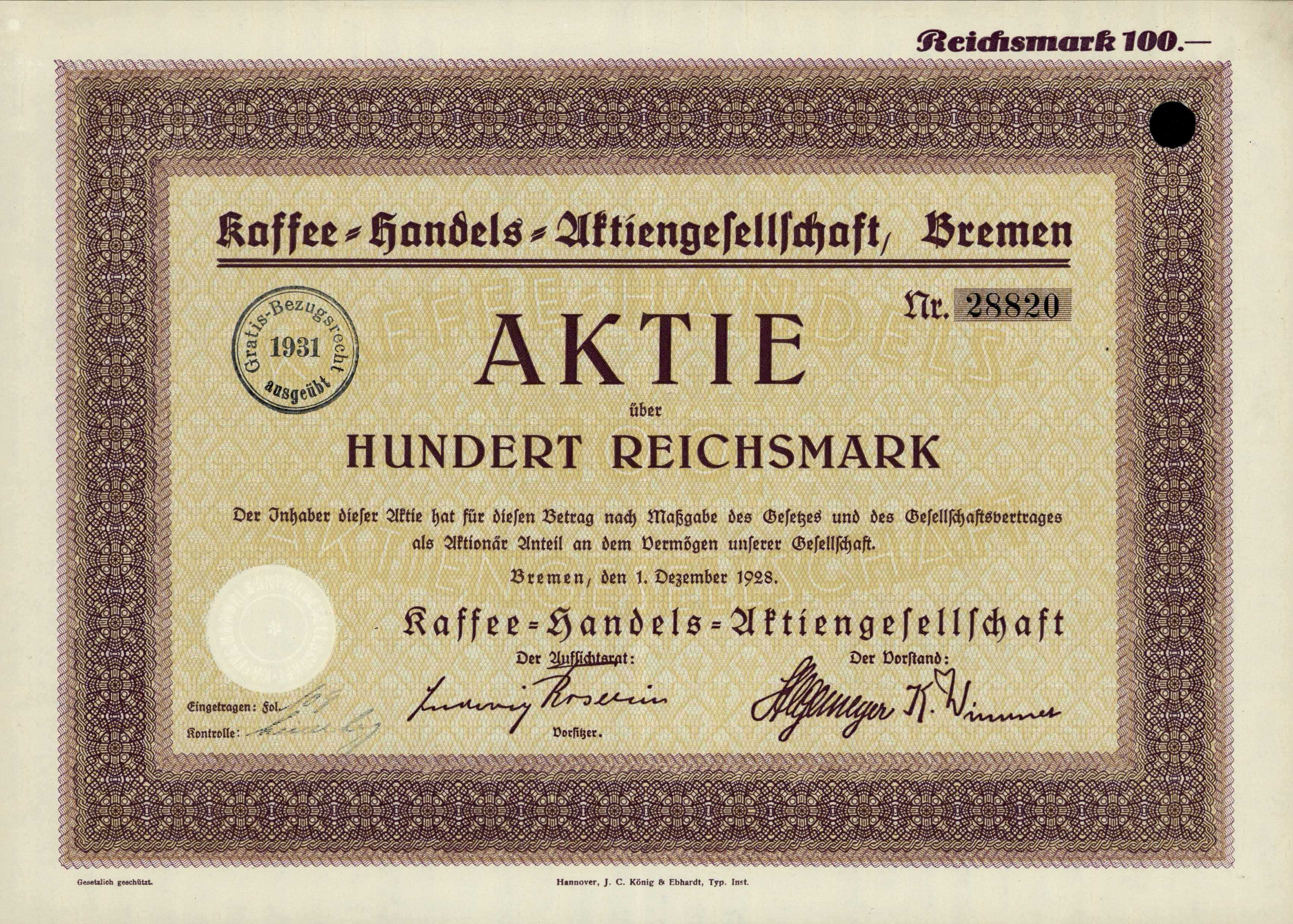
A Café HAG share, issued in 1928

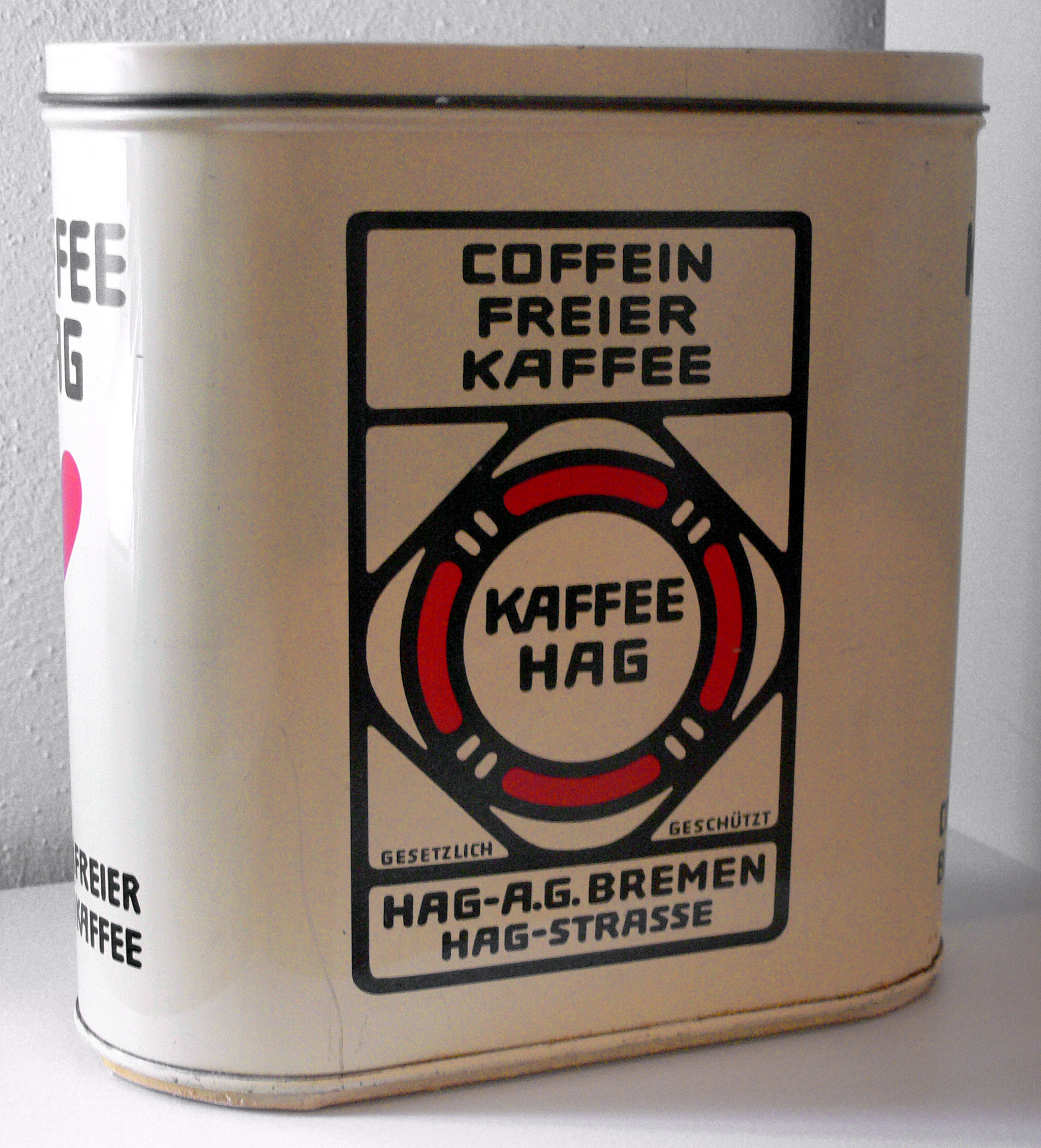
Coffee tin

Café HAG was founded in Bremen in 1906 as Kaffee-Handels-Aktiengesellschaft (Coffee Trading Limited). The company's founder was Ludwig Roselius, who codeveloped the first commercial decaffeination process. Alfred Runge and Eduard Scotland designed posters and packaging, and are credited with designs that defined the company.

In the 1920s and 1930s the company was known for the publication of the Café HAG albums of heraldic emblems.

The coffee brand Sanka spun off from Café HAG in 1910 for the French market ("Sanka" is a contraction of sans caféine), and American rights to the Sanka name were sold in 1913.

The Kellogg Company purchased Roselius's American branch (based in Cleveland, Ohio) in 1928, then sold it to General Foods in 1939. General Foods acquired the original German company in 1979. In 1990 Kraft Foods merged with General Foods, thus HAG and Sanka became brands of the American company. The spelling Café HAG was standardized in the 1990s. HAG has been owned by JDE Peet's since 2015.

Café HAG TV adverts were popular in the 1980s; in particular the character Klaus (played by Roger Callister) became something of a cult figure among advertisement aficionados.
