= SS Kronprinzessin Cecilie =

SS Kronprinzessin Cecilie may refer to one of these ships:

- SS Kronprinzessin Cecilie (1893), 593 gross register tons (GRT), ex Prinz Waldemar (1893), twin screw, steel steamer built Howaldtswerke-Deutsche Werft, Kiel, still registered in early 1930s as owned by Mecklenburger Seebüder-Linie, Rostock, Germany
- SS Kronprinzessin Cecilie (1905), 8,688 gross register tons (GRT), Hamburg-America Line passenger ship launched 14 October 1905 by Krupp Aktiengesellschaft Germaniawerft, Kiel, Germany
- SS Kronprinzessin Cecilie (1906), 18,372 gross register tons (GRT), Norddeutscher Lloyd passenger ship launched 1 December 1906 by AG Vulcan, Stettin, Germany
