= Heinrich Wiegand =

Johann Heinrich Christoph Wiegand (17 August 1855 in Bremen – 29 March 1909 in Bad Homburg vor der Höhe) was a lawyer who served as general director of the Norddeutscher Lloyd shipping company during a period of great expansion.

== Life and career ==
Wiegand was born in Bremen, where his father, originally from the Upper Weser region, owned a profitable nursery and landscaping business. A teacher persuaded him to allow his son to study at the gymnasium and then go to university. He studied law at the universities of Erlangen, Bonn, Berlin and Strassburg, passed the bar at Lübeck and earned a Doctor of Law degree by examination at Göttingen in 1879, and went into practice as a lawyer in Bremen that same year. He was interested in transport and in 1878 had taken the state examination in Colmar and become a referendary as the first step to a career with the railway. In his first case for Norddeutscher Lloyd in 1884, he demonstrated an excellent mastery of maritime and business law; in 1889 he became the company's general counsel. Beginning at the end of that decade, he tried repeatedly to persuade businessmen in Bremen to promote industry, which the city lacked. In particular he attempted to make Bremen the base of operations for American development of electric trams in Germany through the Ludwig Loewe company of Berlin. These efforts having failed, he was on the point of moving to Berlin when Johann Georg Lohmann died suddenly on 9 February 1892 and he was chosen to succeed him as director of Norddeutscher Lloyd from 1 April 1892. Initially two vice presidents were to assist him; after two years both had retired and until his own death in 1909, he worked with Geo Plate, the head of the board of directors and the man who had proposed his name. In 1899 his title became general director and Plate's, president.

In 1905, Wiegand was offered the position of State Secretary for the Colonies, but refused it; Chancellor von Bülow considered having Kaiser Wilhelm II order him to accept.

He died of kidney disease at a spa at the age of 53.

== Achievements ==
Wiegand overhauled and greatly expanded the NDL fleet, phasing out Lohmann's express liners and introducing the larger and faster Barbarossa class, which were widely emulated, and the SS Kaiser Wilhelm der Grosse and sister ships, the first four funnel liners. He also presided over a great expansion of the company's routes, through both direct services and subsidiaries, especially in the Far East and Australasia. For a time at least, the company dominated its rival, the Hamburg-America Line. Despite a serious financial downturn beginning in 1907, Wiegand was also able to preside over most of the building of a vast new headquarters, the largest building in Bremen, for which the foundation stone for the last section was laid that year to celebrate the company's 50th anniversary; it was completed after his death, in 1910.

Both to further NDL's business interests and because he remained convinced that Bremen needed industry, he founded several industrial plants, in particular Atlas Elektronik (founded in 1902 as Norddeutsche Maschinen- und Armaturenfabrik), developed the company's repair and manufacturing facilities including a basin for testing hull models, was a prime mover in developing the industrial harbour and set up the Norddeutsche Hütte there in 1907 as the nucleus of a steel plant, and developed coal fields in partnership with Krupp. The industries that NDL developed under him were known in Bremen as the "Wiegand industries", and included companies that were important to Germany's interests abroad, such as Deutsche Südseephosphat AG, headquartered in Bremen and founded in 1908.

== Business philosophy ==
Wiegand had a close and friendly relationship with the company's head of engineering, Max Walter, and adopted technical innovations rapidly where safety was concerned; for example, the telegraph was installed in 1899 on the Kaiser Wilhelm der Grosse, and by 1913 most NDL steamers had it and also sonar. However, the company remained slow in adopting other innovations, notably turbine propulsion, as it had been to introduce twin-screw propulsion.

Norddeutscher Lloyd and Hamburg-America were locked in competition throughout Wiegand's tenure. However, he remained on friendly terms with Albert Ballin, head of the rival company. In 1905 he wrote to him:

In my view, the field of opportunities is large enough for us both that it leaves both companies sufficient room for expansion. That we have competed with each other and sought to reduce each other in particular areas, all annoyance and chagrin that now one and now the other of us has thereby experienced, has now, however, been forgotten in the end.

There were several proposals for cooperation from both sides during the two men's tenures. At the end of his life, in autumn 1918, Ballin told a meeting of the Hamburg-America board that the only person he knew who could have helped them in the crisis of the losing war was the late Heinrich Wiegand.

Wiegand was, however, reluctant to let NDL become part of J. P. Morgan's International Mercantile Marine combine along with Hamburg-America, as urged by Ballin and Kaiser Wilhelm II; the Kaiser described him as ein eigensinniger Friese (an obstinate Frisian) for his initial refusal, but he eventually agreed to the plan. Throughout his career, he saw German business and German patriotism as linked, writing in a letter of "die Verbindung kaufmännischer Solidität und nationaler Denkungsart" (the connection between being a solid business person and thinking in a national manner). He attempted to keep the press from reporting on the Kaiser's inflammatory "Hun speech" on the occasion of the German force shipping out of Bremerhaven to suppress the Boxer Rebellion in China, and deeply regretted not having told the Kaiser in advance that he was misinformed about the extent of atrocities there.

He gave public recognition to the NDL workers for their contributions to the company, on one occasion at a banquet aboard the Imperial yacht Hohenzollern noting to the Kaiser that the company could not have achieved what it was being praised for without the workers, and naming specific examples. According to his memoirs, the Chancellor thanked him privately for giving the Kaiser a different view of the German worker than he was used to. During his tenure he expanded the Seamen's Pension Fund, founded a Lloyd Widows' and Orphans' Fund, and in 1900 in memory of his wife established the Elisabeth Wiegand-Stiftung (Elisabeth Wiegand Foundation) in aid of needy current and former NDL employees and their dependents.
