= Lambda (disambiguation) =

Lambda (Λ or λ) is the 11th letter of the Greek alphabet.

Lambda may also refer to:

== Arts, entertainment, and media ==
- Lambda (newspaper), a student newspaper at Laurentian University, Canada
- Lambda-class shuttle, a fictional entity in the Star Wars universe
- Lambda Angelus, a character in the video game Tales of Graces
- Lambda, the logo of the Half-Life video game series
- Colony Lambda, a fictional location in the game Xenoblade Chronicles 3
- Lambda (novel), by David Musgrave
- LAMBDA, The London Academy of Music and Dramatic Art
- The Bohlen–Pierce Lambda scale, a non-octave musical scale consisting of four whole steps and five half steps

== Organisations ==
- Lambda (association), for gay people in Odense, Denmark
- Lambda (Mozambican organization), for LGBTQ+ health, advocacy, and public awareness.
- Lambda (olive oil), a Greek brand
- Lambda Legal, American LGBTQ+ civil rights organization.
- Lambda Groups Association, an LGBT movement organization in Poland
- Lambda School of Music and Fine Arts, in Montreal, Quebec, Canada

== Science and technology ==
- Lambda (anatomy), a point on the skull
- Lambda (unit), a non-SI unit of volume
- Lambda baryon, a family of subatomic particles
- SARS-CoV-2 Lambda variant, a COVID-19 variant
- Lambda calculus and lambda expression, in mathematics

=== Computing ===
- Lambda (programming), a function that is not bound to an identifier
- LaMDA, a neural language model developed by Google
- AWS Lambda, a serverless computing platform by Amazon
- Lambda architecture, a data-processing architecture

== Transportation ==
- Lambda (rocket family), a series of Japanese rockets
- General Motors Lambda platform, an automobile platform
- Hyundai Lambda engine, an automobile engine
- Lancia Lambda, an Italian automobile 1922–1931

== Other uses ==
- Lambda, an LGBT symbol
- Lambda Literary Awards, also known as the "Lammys"
- Lambda García (born 1987), Mexican actor

== See also ==
- Lambda expression (disambiguation)
- Lambda baryon, a subatomic particle
- Lambda Lambda Lambda, a fictional college fraternity in the Revenge of the Nerds series
  - Lambda Lambda Lambda, an American fraternity inspired by the fictional fraternity
- Lambda Legal, an American civil rights organization
- Lambda phage, a virus that infects bacteria
- Lambda point, when fluid helium transitions to superfluid helium
- Lambda transition, in condensed matter physics
- Lambda-11, a character in the BlazBlue game series
- Lamda (disambiguation)
- System lambda, an incremental cost of generating electricity
