= Landay =

Landay may refer to:

- Landay (poetry), a traditional Afghan poetic form
- Landay, Helmand, a town in Helmand Province, Afghanistan
- Landay, Nimruz, a place in Nimruz Province, Afghanistan
- Landay (surname)

== See also ==
- Landau (disambiguation)
