= Landeau =

Landeau is a variant of the Germanic name "Landau". Notable people with the name include:

- Alexia Landeau (b. 1975), French actress
- Rémy Landeau (1859 – 1934), French painter

== See also ==
- Landau (disambiguation)
- Landauer (disambiguation)
