= David Landau =

David Landau may refer to:

- David J. Landau (1920–1996), Polish-born Holocaust survivor and author who settled in Australia
- David Landau (screenwriter), American screenwriter
- David Landau (journalist) (1947–2015), editor of Israeli daily newspaper Haaretz
- David Landau (actor) (1879–1935), American film actor of the 1930s
- David P. Landau (born 1941), professor of physics at the University of Georgia
- David E. Landau, American law professor
