= Landa (surname) =

Landa is a surname of multiple origins. Notable people with the surname include:

- Alfredo Landa (1933–2013), Spanish actor
- Antonio Landa (born 1979), Mexican footballer
- Benny Landa (born 1946) Israeli entrepreneur and inventor
- Diego de Landa (1524–1579), fourth bishop of Yucatán
- Daniel Landa (born 1968), Czech musician
- Eli Landa (born 1984), Norwegian model
- Honorino Landa (1942–1987), Chilean footballer
- Konstantin Landa (1972–2022), Russian chess grandmaster
- Leire Landa (born 1986), Spanish footballer
- Lucas Landa (born 1986), Argentine footballer
- Manuel de Landa (born 1952), Mexican-American writer
- Miguel Ángel Landa (born 1938), Venezuelan actor, stand-up comedian, and television personality
- Mikel Landa (born 1989), Spanish racing cyclist
- Polina Landa (1931–2022), Russian physicist
- Rebecca Landa (born 1955), American speech-language pathologist

Fictional characters:

- Hans Landa, character in the film Inglourious Basterds

== See also ==
- Landa (disambiguation)
- Landauer
- Landau (surname)
