= Lisel Oppel =

German painter

- Born: Anna Amalie Elisabeth Oppel; 14 October 1897; Bremen, Germany
- Died: 11 July 1960 (aged 62); Bremen, West Germany
- Occupation: Painter
- Spouse: none
- Children: Claudio
- Parent(s): Alwin Oppel (1849-1929); Amalie Baumann

Anna Amalie Elisabeth "Lisel" Oppel (14 October 1897 – 11 July 1960) was a German painter. Sixty years after her death, she remains one of the better remembered representatives of the Worpswede Artists' Colony.

== Biography ==
=== Provenance and early years ===
Anna Amalie Elisabeth "Lisel" Oppel was born at Bremen, the youngest of her parents' seven, or more (Note: Sources vary) children. Alwin Oppel (1849–1929), her father, was a secondary school teacher and a distinguished economist. Her mother, Amalie Oppel, born Amalie Baumann, was her father's second wife and came originally from Herisau (Appenzell) in the traditionally conservative north-east of Switzerland. While Lisel was growing up the family lived at Lübecker Straße 31, a town house in the heart of Bremen.

During 1914/15 Oppel studied for three terms at the "Kunst-gewerbeschule" (as the Bremen applied arts academy was then known). Here her teachers included Ernst Müller-Scheessel with whom she studied landscape painting. Following the outbreak of war at the end of July 1914 she broke off her studies, concentrating on looking after her parents over the next couple of years. She resumed her studied during 1917/18, spending three terms, this time, at the (subsequently renamed and then merged) "Königliche Kunstgewerbeschule" (loosely, "Royal Academy of Applied Art") in Munich. The academy director, Richard Riemerschmid, was among her teachers. She was also taught by Hermann Groeber, who is to have been particularly encouraging and influential in respect of her subsequent career development.

Two of Lisa Oppel's maternal-side aunts in Switzerland were acknowledged painters. Her own wish to train as an artist had triggered no significant parental opposition. She nevertheless rejected suggestions that she should become an art teacher, thereby ruling out the chance to embark on what was seen as a relatively secure career with a regular income. Instead her ambition, according to surviving academy records, was to become a "freelance artist".

=== Worpswede ===
From 1919 she was based in the village of Worpswede which since 1889 had been designated, by a number of influential artists of the period, as an Artists' Colony. Between 1919 and 1929, albeit with several major breaks, she lodged at a succession of farm cottages and other dwellings in and around the village in order to pursue her career as an artist. Art was not always sufficiently lucrative to pay the rent, and she frequently supplemented her income with farm work, especially during the crisis years immediately following the war. Worpswede remained her home base till 1960, the year of her death, although there were a number of extended trips abroad through those years. In 1920 she moved in to live for a couple of years with Martha Vogeler, then newly divorced, at her little museum complex ("Haus am Schluh"). After a succession of further moves Oppel installed herself in her final Worpswede home, the so-called "Weyerberg Hut" ("Weyerberghütte") in 1954.

=== Campania ===
Between 1927 and 1937 Oppel took several trips to Italy, sometimes apparently on a whim, and including at least one visit lasting several years. In Italy she produced watercolors and oil paintings. She also undertook work for ceramics businesses locally. The longest of her Italian trips took her to the Bay of Naples and lasted five years, between 1930 and 1935. Sources conflict over the time line of her five years stay, but according to at least one version she lived initially, following her arrival, in Vietri. Then, in 1932/33, she moved to Positano, also living at one stage on the Island of Ischia. According to at least one source it was between 1930 and 1932 that she worked as a ceramics artist at the "Industria Ceramica Salernitades" (I.C.S.) ceramics and pottery factory in Vietri. The factory had been set up a few years earlier by an expatriate businessman from Hamburg called Max Melamerson. During the years directly preceding the Second World War it provided employment to a succession of footloose painters from northern Germany. Oppel was also by now receiving - and continued to receive throughout her life - a small monthly payment from an unidentified source in Bremen which she herself identifies in her papers simply as her "väterliche Rente" ("paternal pension"). Little that is identifiable as Oppel's work survives from her work with the ceramicists, and indeed most of her surviving output comes from work that she produced after 1945. Two large vases with scenic motifs and one image of a kneeling madonna with child, all of them featuring Oppel's painting from the 1930s, have been located in a private collection on Ischia, however.

=== Claudio ===
The Bay of Naples and the Amalfi Coastal strip beyond it, along the road towards Salerno, attracted many German intellectuals during the 1920s and 1930s. A network of expatriate artists grew up. Among those in the circle to which Lisel Oppel adhered were Kurt Craemer and his friend Karli Sohn-Rethel who shared a house in Positano till 1938. Others were Irene Kowaliska and Armin Wegner.

Lissel Oppel's son, Claudio, was born on Ischia during the summer of 1932. As far as is known, she brought the boy up without support from his father, on whose identity sources are conspicuously silent. Claudio would grow up to become a secondary school teacher in Germany like his grandfather.

=== Régime change ===
When she returned to Worpswede in 1935 Germany's political context had changed violently. Two years earlier right-wing populists had interpreted the country's parliamentary deadlock as a political opportunity, successfully taking power in January 1933. The Hitler government had lost no time in transforming what had been seen as a robust democracy into a one-party dictatorship. The Artists' Colony had also been transformed. In order to pursue any sort of career as an artist it was now necessary to become a member of the government's National Chamber of Visual Artists. Many had already done just that. Lisel Oppel rejected that approach, however, which meant that from now on she was unable to obtain the tools of her craft except through "unofficial channels". Her rejection of Nazism while living in Nazi Germany displayed self-belief and courage, as she presumably knew, but there will have been many at that time who would have seen it as an unwise choice. Her immediate solution to the tide difficulties she faced was to return to Italy, arriving this time in Calabria, early in 1936.

In Italy, a post-democratic government was also making life harder for artists not instinctively drawn to support the increasingly bizarre and destructive whims of the leadership, and in 1937 Lisel Oppel again came back to Worpswede. Between 1937 she worked from home for a Bremen-based Stoneware producer. In September 1939 a repeat partition of Poland triggered another major war. Oppel was conscripted to work as a technical draftswoman for the vast AG Weser shipbuilding company, and forced to live in a rented room in Bremen. Claudio at this stage remained in Worpswede, where he continued to attend school and where arrangements were made for him to be looked after. Oppel's career as a conscripted technical draftswoman lasted barely a year. In 1940 she collected her son and together they made their way south again, this time heading for the Chiemsee, a reedy lake in the marshy land between Munich and Salzburg. the move appears to have been the result of a characteristically impulsive decision, although a desire to get the child away from the British bombing would have provided an obvious rationale for it. Their destination was the so-called "Fraueninsel", an island in the lake on which she was able to work again as a ceramicist at the island's potters' studio. She was back in Catholic territory again, and her output included more than painted tiles: there were angel-candlesticks and madonnas, kneeling or sitting, cradling a little Baby Jesus in her arms. She lived with her son in a holiday chalet owned by a family who according to the boy's later recollections treated Claudio like one of their own children. For part of her nearly three-year stint in Upper Bavaria Oppel lived and worked at a pottery factory on the shores of another lake, at Dießen am Ammersee. The nature of her contractual arrangements during this time is not known, but it is evident that at least some of the work she was producing – possibly all of it – was made on the basis that she was working for herself, presumably renting space and equipment from the pottery in question, since she regularly shipped tiles to her friend Martha Vogeler in Artists' Colony so that they might be sold there. Sometimes she even took a train north and handed them over in person. Alongside the commercial work necessary to feed herself and her son, Lissel Oppel never abandoned what she regarded as her real profession, as a "fine art" painter.

=== Fine art and war ===
Every one or two years between 1937 and 1942 Oppel exhibited paintings in Bremen, participating in each of five collective exhibitions organised by the GEDOK, the nationwide association of female artists and art promoters of which she had become a member soon after its creation in 1926. Neither her move to Bavaria nor – at least till after 1942 - the war appear to have inhibited this. She built her reputation with buyers and critics, through her characteristic landscapes depicting the Teufelsmoor (loosely, "Devil's bog"), the fenland surrounding Worpswede in the otherwise mostly unpeopled countryside north of Bremen. From her time living and working on the island on the Chiemsee there are paintings of boats and the Chiemgau landscape, along with portraits of the potter, his wife, and the family with which she and her son lived there. These paintings are still (2020) in private collections.

Meanwhile, Claudio completed his middle school career. In 1943 his mother enrolled him at a boarding school at Krems (on the edge of Vienna). This turned out badly, however, so she removed him from that institution and sent him instead to a "Bremen" secondary school which had been evacuated to a site at Lofer, just outside Salzburg, where he remained a pupil all the way through till September 1945. With Claudio securely settled in the south Oppel returned to Worpswede where she lived out the rest of the war, supporting herself with work for a ceramics factory in Bremen. She now befriended a French prisoner of war: contacts of this nature were against the rules, and someone denounced her to the authorities. On 21 March 1945 she was sentenced to twelve months of forced labour. Initially she was placed in a prison in Wesermünde (as Bremerhaven had been temporarily renamed in 1939), before being transferred to another prison in nearby Stade. A month later the region was captured by British forces, however, and Oppel was released on 21 April 1945. Twelve months of forced labour had turned out to be no more than one month in prison.

=== Postwar years ===
Directly after the war Oppel seriously contemplated relocating to France. Instead she continued to base herself at Worpswede, but continued to be as internationally footloose as ever. She spent several months in Switzerland and revisited Positano and Ischia. She also discovered Spain and Morocco, sending long enthusiastic letters from Marrakesh to a friend. Her penultimate foreign trip was to Egypt, from where she referenced the Nunc dimittis ominously in a letter: "Now I can depart in peace, since mine eyes have seen ..." By the time she got back to Worpswede she clearly knew she was unwell, but she nevertheless insisted on travelling to Seville to experience the Easter celebrations there, impressions of which she recorded in an interesting series of watercolors. By the time she got home this time her illness could no longer be ignored. She was admitted to the hospital known today as the "Klinikum Bremen-Ost" where spinal cancer was diagnosed. She died very soon after receiving the diagnosis.

== Works ==
As regards her painting, and in terms at least of the sheer quantity of known output, by far Lisel Oppel's most productive decade was her last, the 1950s. The paintings take forward the expressive approach adumbrated by her early work from the 1920s, but also powerfully reflecting an enhanced emphasis on the stronger colours and light which she had discovered during her visits to Italy during the 1930s, and now reinvigorated by her various extended visits to other parts of the Mediterranean region after 1945. Most of her paintings, especially those produced close to her Worpswede home, were in oils. Themes include people and animals, village life showing both people at work and people celebrating, notably in the moorland basin of the River Hamme. A particular joy in her painting, was children, often at play, in the countryside, which picked up on themes that had also inspired an earlier generation of Worpswede painters. Her image of "Lantern Children", with a background clearly showing the Hamme flatlands, achieved particular commercial success during the 1950s: this was a subject of which she painted countless variations.

The other recurring theme of her later work, during a decade when foreign leisure travel was unaffordable for most Germans, was "distant lands". She would return from her travels with stacks of water colours. She liked to paint fisherfolk and farmers in southern Italy. There were street scenes of Madrid and Seville, along with paintings of the harbour at Tangier and life among the bazaars in Marrakesh. Her 1954 solo exhibition "Bremen Artists on the road" at the Kunsthalle was a particular success with the public.

Loppel's sheer productivity, especially during her final decade, enabled her to make a good living from her painting. Her pictures were accessible and reassuring in ways that suited the mood of the times. The life of a freelance artist who had eluded her as a young woman became a reality, and she was no longer driven to offer her services to industrial pottery factories. After her death interest in her work declined, but her reputation has undergone something of a revival following an exhibition of her work presented at the "Queen Christina House" ("Christinenhaus") in Zeven to mark the centenary of her birth. Prices at auctions when one of her works has gone on sale have also risen significantly over the past couple of decades. In 2008 her son Claudio, by this point described in sources as a "retired teacher", gifted a number of her paintings and other elements from her inheritance to the "Worpswede Archive" in the Barkenhoff, a large reassigned farm house in the heart of the artists' town. That means that more of her work turns up in public displays. Most of her output remains in private collections, however.
