= The Book of Beliefs and Opinions =

10th century Jewish philosophy text

The Book of Beliefs and Opinions (Judeo-Arabic: כתאב אלאמאנאת ואלאעתקאדאת; Arabic: كتاب الأمانات والاعتقادات, romanized: Kitāb al-Amānāt wa l-Iʿtiqādāt) is a book written by Saadia Gaon (completed 933) which is the first systematic presentation and philosophic foundation of the dogmas of Judaism.

The work was originally in Judeo-Arabic in Hebrew alphabet with quotations from the Torah. The first Hebrew translation was done in 1186 by Judah ben Saul ibn Tibbon, titled Emunot ve-Deot (Hebrew: אמונות ודעות Beliefs and Opinions). An unabridged translation into English by Samuel Rosenblatt was published in 1948.

An introduction precedes the work, which consists of ten chapters, and it was completed in 933.

== Premise and introduction ==
The work was mainly written to defend Rabbinic Judaism against Karaite Judaism, which rejects the Oral Torah (Mishnah and Talmud).

In his detailed introduction, Saadia speaks of the reasons that led him to compose it. His heart was grieved when he saw the confusion concerning matters of religion that prevailed among his contemporaries, finding an unintelligent belief and unenlightened views current among those who professed Judaism while those who denied the faith triumphantly vaunted their errors. Men were sunken in the sea of doubt and overwhelmed by the waves of spiritual error, and there was none to help them, so Saadia felt called and duty-bound to save them from their peril by strengthening the faithful in their belief and by removing the fears of those who were in doubt.

After a general presentation of the causes of uncertainty and doubt and the essence of belief, Saadia describes the three natural sources of knowledge: namely, the perceptions of the senses, the light of reason, and logical necessity, as well as the fourth source of knowledge possessed by those that fear God, the "veritable revelation" contained in the Scriptures. He shows that a belief in the teachings of revelation does not exclude an independent search for knowledge but that speculation on religious subjects rather endeavours to prove the truth of the teachings received from the Prophets and to refute attacks upon revealed doctrine, which must be raised by philosophical investigation to the plane of actual knowledge.

== Contents ==
In the first two sections, Saadia discusses the metaphysical problems of the creation of the world (i.) and the unity of the Creator (ii.); in the following sections, he discusses revelation (iii.) and the doctrines of belief based upon divine justice, including obedience and disobedience (iv.), as well as merit and demerit (v.). Closely connected with these sections are those that treat of the soul and of death (vi.), and of the resurrection of the dead (vii.), which, according to the author, forms part of the theory of the Messianic redemption (viii.). The work concludes with a section on the rewards and punishments of the future life (ix.). The tenth section, on the best mode of life for mankind in this world, must be regarded as an appendix, since its admonitions to moral conduct supplement the exhortations to right thought and right belief contained in the main body.

The most important points contained in the individual sections are as follows:

=== i The creation of the world ===
For the doctrine of the creation of the world, Saadia offers four proofs; three of these show the influence of Aristotelian philosophy, which may also be traced elsewhere in his writings. After his rational demonstrations have led him to the conclusion that the world was created ex nihilo, he proceeds to state and refute the twelve theories of the origin of the world. This part of the first section gives a most interesting insight into Saadia's knowledge of the Greek philosophers, which he probably derived from reading Aristotle. At the end of the section, Saadia refutes specific objections to the Jewish doctrine of Creation, especially those that proceed from the concepts of time and space.

=== ii The unity of the Creator ===
The theory of God is prefaced by a development of the view that human knowledge arises by degrees from the merest sensuous impressions to the most subtle concepts so that the idea of the divine, which transcends all other knowledge in subtlety, is itself a proof of its verity. The concept of God in Judaism as a creator necessarily implies the attributes of life, power, and knowledge. In like manner, the concept of a creator demonstrates the unity of God. For this view three direct and three indirect proofs are offered by Saadia, the latter showing that dualism is absurd. See apophatic theology and divine simplicity.

The thesis of God's absolute unity is established by refuting the Christian doctrine of the Trinity, which, in Saadia's opinion, arises from a misinterpretation of the three attributes of God already named: life, power, and knowledge. Connected with the refutation of the dogma of the Trinity is an outline of the various theories respecting the person of Jesus that reveals an accurate understanding of Christian controversies. See Jewish principles of faith: Divine Unity.

To render possible an understanding of the monotheistic concept of God in all its purity, and to free the statements of the Scriptures from their apparent contradictions of the spirituality of the absolute idea of God, Saadia interprets all the difficulties of the Bible that bear upon this problem, using the scheme of the ten Aristotelian categories, none of which, he shows, may be applied to God. After this section, the author shows a deep religious feeling about the relation to the Deity sustained by the human soul when permeated by the true knowledge of God.

=== iii Revelation and the Commandments ===
The mitzvot "divine commandments" revealed in the Torah have been given to man by the grace of God as a means to attain the highest blessedness. According to a classification borrowed by Saadia from the Muʿtazila but based upon an essentially Jewish view, the commandments are divided into those of reason and of revelation, although even the latter may be explained rationally, as is shown by numerous examples. An excursus, in which Saadia attacks the view of the Hindu sect of the "Barahima" (Brahmans) to the effect that man needs no prophets, introduces his account of prophecy and his apology for the Prophets. This is followed by theses on the essential content of the Bible and the credibility of Biblical tradition, by a detailed refutation of the Christian and Islamic view that the Law revealed in Israel has been repealed, and by a polemic against a series of Hiwi al-Balkhi's objections to the authority of the Scriptures.

=== iv Free will: obedience and disobedience ===
The foundation of this section is the theory of the freedom of the will and its reconciliation with the omnipotence and omniscience of God. In its opening portion Saadia postulates the anthropocentric doctrine that regards man as the object of all creation; and at its close he explains under eight headings those passages of the Bible that might cause doubt regarding the freedom of the acts of man. See Free will In Jewish thought.

=== v Merit and demerit ===
People fall into ten classes concerning merit, demerit, and religious and moral bearings. In his description of the first two, the pious and the impious, Saadia devotes himself to the problem of the sufferings of the devout and the good fortune of the impious. In contrast, the description of the last class, that of the contrite, leads him to detailed considerations, based upon the Bible, of repentance, prayer, and other evidences of human piety.

=== vi The soul and death ===
A survey of six other theories prefaces his view on the soul. The list is a parallel of those provided already by Aristotle and Pseudo-Plutarch. He states the relation of the soul to the body, the basis of their union, their cooperation in human activity, their coexistence or the appointed term of life, their separation or death, and the state of the soul after death. The section concludes with refuting the doctrine of gilgul or metempsychosis.

=== vii The resurrection of the dead ===
Here Saadia refutes the objections made, based on nature, reason, and the Bible, to the doctrine of the resurrection of the dead, and presents the proof for it contained in tradition. He then discusses ten questions bearing on this doctrine, which are of interest as "affording an insight into popular views that then prevailed, and which, despite their singularity, could not be ignored even by such a man as Saadia" (Guttmann).

=== viii Messianic redemption ===
The teachings regarding Messianic redemption are based almost entirely on statements of the Bible and the Talmud, the definite year of salvation being fixed by an interpretation of well-known passages in the Book of Daniel. In the concluding portion the author refutes those who assume that the Messianic prophecies refer to the time of the Second Temple; he also argues against the Christian doctrine of the Messiah.

=== ix The world to come ===
Saadia demonstrates that the compensations of the world to come are proved by reason, the Bible, and tradition, and answers various questions bearing upon this subject.

=== x Moral conduct, thought and belief ===
The system of ethics contained in the appendix is based mostly on a description and criticism of thirteen different objects of life, to which Saadia adds his own counsels for rational and moral living. He also adds that in the case of each of the five senses, only the concordant union of sensuous impressions is beneficial, thus showing how great the need is for a harmonious combination of the qualities and the impulses of the soul of man. He concludes with the statement that he intends his book only to purify and ennoble the hearts of his readers.

== Translation ==
=== Ibn Tibbon ===
Although the work was originally in Arabic, it was translated by rabbi and physician Judah ben Saul ibn Tibbon, who also translated the Kuzari of Judah Halevi. This version was first printed in Constantinople in 1562 and frequently republished, while the original was edited in Arabic characters by Samuel Landauer (Leiden, 1880), and another (superior) Judeo-Arabic edition prepared by Yosef Qafih in 1970.

=== Others ===
- Saadia, Gaon (1948). The Book of Beliefs and Opinions. Yale University Press. ISBN 9780300008654.

Another translation, or rather paraphrase, of the Kitāb al-Amānāt wa l-Iʿtiqādāt, of uncertain authorship, is contained in several manuscripts (the most important being MS. Vatican 266); large portions of this rendering were edited by Gollancz (ha-Nakdan, Berechiah (1902). The ethical treatises of Berachya son of Rabbi Natronai Ha-Nakdan: being the compendium and the Marṣref. David Nutt.; comp. "Monatsschrift," xlvi. 536). It was the principal means by which Saadia's philosophy was known to non-Arabic speaking Jews during the twelfth and thirteenth centuries. The Paraphrase was an important and influential document to the evolution of theology of the early medieval Haside Ashkenaz (not to be confused with Hasidic Judaism of the 18th century), the Maimonidean controversy and early Kabbalah. Its language is highly poetic. The seventh section, on the resurrection, is contained in two versions, the first of which, the basis of the translation of ibn Tibbon, has been edited by Bacher in the "Steinschneider Festschrift," pp. 98–112, and the second by Landauer. This paraphrase, entitled Pitron Sefer ha-Emunot ve-Ḥerṣav ha-Binot, will be published by the Israel Academy of Sciences and the Humanities.

== External links and references ==
Bibliography

- Saadia B. Joseph public domain, 1906 Jewish Encyclopedia
- Stroumsa, Sarah (2003), "Saadya and Jewish kalam", in Frank, Daniel H.; Leaman, Oliver (eds.), The Cambridge Companion to Medieval Jewish Philosophy, Cambridge: Cambridge University Press, pp. 71–90, ISBN 978-0-521-65207-0

Resources

- Full text, Qafih transl. (Hebrew), daat.ac.il
- The Book of Beliefs and Opinions. Transl. Samuel Rosenblatt. Yale Judaica (1948). ISBN 0-300-04490-9
- Full Text in Arabic
