= Portrait of Rainer Maria Rilke =

Painting by Paula Modersohn-Becker

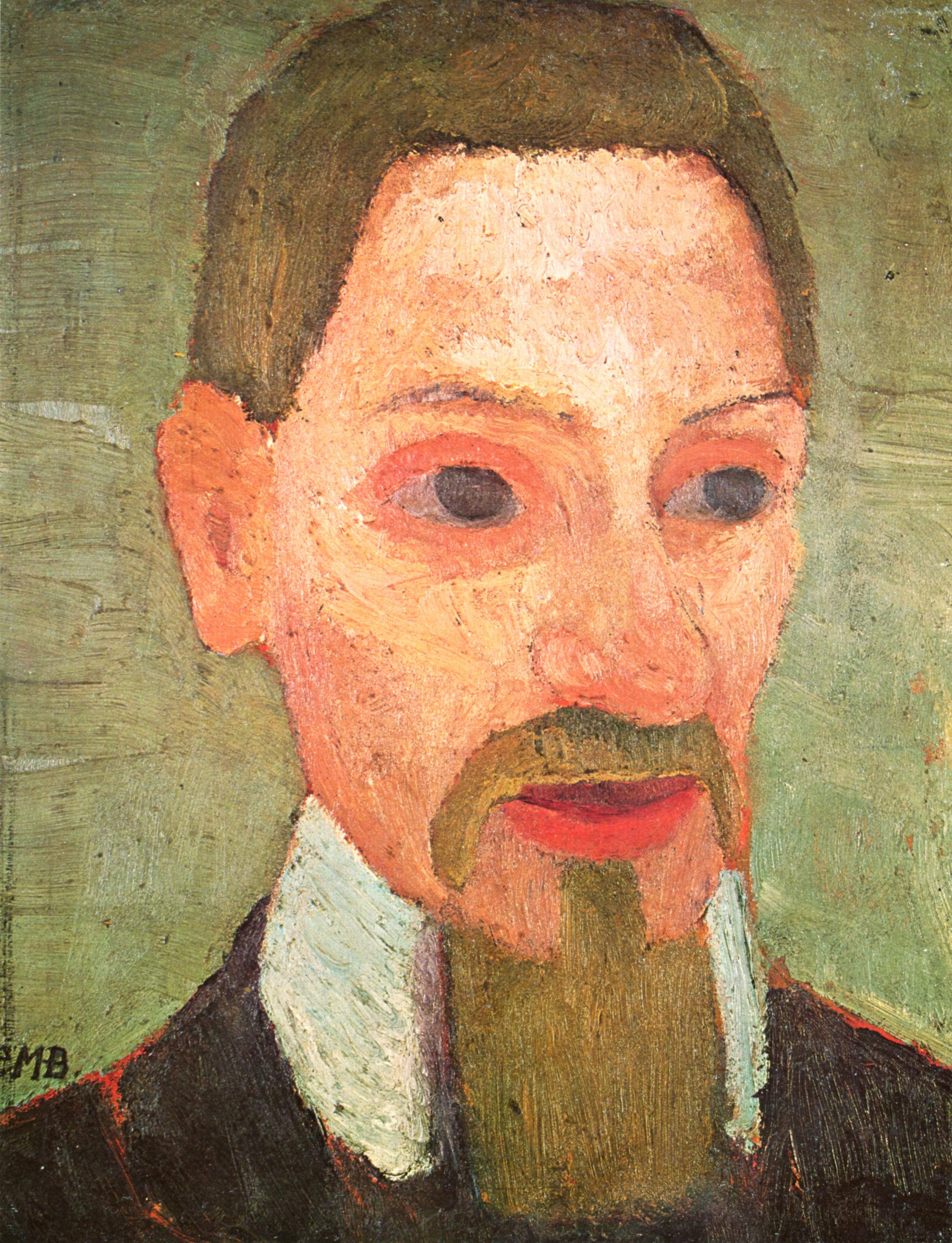
- Artist: Paula Modersohn-Becker
- Year: 1906
- Medium: Oil and tempera on cardboard
- Dimensions: 32.3 cm × 25.4 cm (12.7 in × 10.0 in)
- Location: Ludwig Roselius Museum, Bremen

The Portrait of Rainer Maria Rilke is an oil and tempera on cardboard painting by Paula Modersohn-Becker, from 1906. It is held in the Ludwig Roselius Museum, in Bremen.

== History and description ==
The Austrian poet Rainer Maria Rilke and the painter Paula Modersohn-Becker had been close friends since around 1901. In 1902, however, he didn't mentioned her, nor his own wife, Clara Westhoff, in his art book Worpswede über die Künstlerkolonie , about an artists colony.

In 1906, Modersohn-Becker and Rilke were both living in a boarding house in Paris and had close contact with each other. This portrait was created at that time as an oil tempera on cardboard painting.

The portrait focus on his head, depicting Rilke with a thoughtful and introspective expression, in earthy tones and expressive textures.

Afterwards, both returned to their families. Modersohn-Becker died the following year, shortly after giving birth to a child. The tragic loss deeply affected Rilke. He processed his grief in his poem Requiem for a Friend (1908).

Rilke disliked the current portrait, despite his friendship with the artist. In 1922, Rilke wrote in a letter that he didn't liked any of the portraits that had been made of him so far, with the exception of a bust by Fritz Huf.

Despite his disapproval, the depiction made by Modersohn-Becker became one the most famous of his portraits.
