= Λ² =

Λ² or λ² may refer to:

- Lambda^{2} Fornacis, a star in the constellation Fornax
- Half-Life 2, a 2004 video game developed by Valve Corporation
- The second exterior power in exterior algebra

== See also ==
- Lambda, the 11th letter of the Greek alphabet
- Lambda (disambiguation)
