= Lenda =

Lenda may refer to:

- Lenda, Kenya, a settlement in Coast Province, Kenya
- Ellend, known in Croatian as Lenda, a village in Hungary
- Lenda Murray (born 1962), US bodybuilder
- Lenda Tracy Hanks (1879-1944), US phycologist
- Lenda Vumbi (born 1995), French footballer

== See also ==
- Lahnda (pronounced [lɛnda]), the Western Punjabi dialect cluster
- Lendah, a district in the Kulon Progo Regency, Indonesia
- Landa (disambiguation)
