= Landau (surname) =

Landau is a German and Yiddish toponymic surname derived from one of the two places named Landau. Notable people with the surname include:

- Barry Landau, American collector alleged to have stolen thousands of historical documents
- Bina Landau (1925–1988), Polish-born American Jewish soprano
- Bleu Landau (born 2005), British actor
- Chaim Landau (1916–1981), Israeli politician
- Christopher Landau (born 1963), American lawyer and diplomat
- David J. Landau (1920–1996), author and Holocaust survivor
- David Landau (screenwriter), American screenwriter
- David Landau (journalist), Israeli journalist
- David Landau (actor), American actor
- David P. Landau, American physicist
- Dov Landau (born 1930), Israeli rabbi
- Edmund Landau (1877–1938), German mathematician
- Edie Landau, American television producer
- Ely Landau, American television producer
- Eugen Landau (1852–1935), German banker and philanthropist
- Felix Landau (1910–1983), Austrian National Socialist, SS Hauptscharführer, served in an Einsatzkommando
- Felix Landau (art dealer) (1924–2003), American art dealer
- Gili Landau (born 1958), Israeli football player and manager
- Guttman Landau, Bessarabian Judenrat leader
- H. G. Landau, American mathematical biologist, statistician and sociologist
- Henry Landau, American mathematician
- Henry Landau (captain), British World War I Captain and author
- Jacob Landau (artist), American artist
- Jacob Landau, American journalist
- Jacob ben Judah Landau, rabbi
- Joel Landau, rabbi
- John A. Landau, Rhodesian politician
- Jon Landau, American music critic and record producer
- Jon Landau (film producer) (1960–2024), American film producer
- Judah Leo Landau, rabbi
- Juliet Landau, American actress
- Kurt Landau, Austrian communist
- Lev Landau, Soviet physicist, Nobel laureate
- Lola Landau, Jewish German and Israeli poet
- Martin Landau, American actor
- Michael Landau, American guitarist
- Moshe Landau, Israeli jurist
- Neil Landau, American writer, playwright, producer, director
- Russ Landau, American musician
- Salo Landau, Dutch chess player
- Saul Landau (1936–2013), American author, documentary filmmaker, and academic
- Saul Raphael Landau, lawyer and Zionist activist
- Seth Landau, American film maker
- Siegfried Landau, founder of the Brooklyn Philharmonic
- Susan Landau, American mathematician and engineer
- Suzanne Landau (born 1946), Israeli art museum curator
- Uzi Landau (born 1943), Israeli politician
- William Landau (1924–2017), American neurologist
- Yechezkel Landau (1713–1793), Jewish theologian and decisor
- Yoav Landau (born 1992), Israeli-American musician

== Fictional characters ==
- Burt Landau, fictional character on "FX"
- Dov Landau, fictional character in the novel and film Exodus
- Josef Landau, fictional character in the book Refugee
- Three fictional siblings (Gepard Landau, Lynx Landau, Serval Landau) in the game Honkai: Star Rail

== See also ==
- Landau Eugene Murphy Jr. (born 1974)
- Landauer
- Landa (surname)
- Landay (surname)
