= Landau (disambiguation) =

Landau is a city in Rhineland-Palatinate, Germany.

Landau may also refer to:

== Places ==
- Landau an der Isar, a town in Bavaria, Germany
- Landau, the former name of Shyrokolanivka, which became part of Ukraine after World War II
- Landau (crater), on the far side of the Moon

== Vehicles ==
- Landau (carriage), a type of convertible carriage named after the city of Landau
- Landau (automobile), a type of convertible auto
- Ford Landau, an automobile produced in Brazil from 1971 to 1983
- Ford Landau (Australia), an automobile produced in Australia from 1973 to 1976

== People and fictional characters ==
- Landau (surname)

== Other uses ==
- Big O notation, also called Landau notation or Bachmann-Landau notation, a mathematical notation describing the limiting behaviour of a function
- Landau quantization, the quantization of the cyclotron orbits of charged particles in a uniform magnetic field, named for Lev Landau
- ASV Landau, a German football club based in Landau, Rhineland-Palatinate

== See also ==
- Landau Institute for Theoretical Physics, near Moscow, Russia, named for Lev Landau
- Landau Commission, set up by the Israeli Government in 1987
