= Irene Kowaliska =

Italian painter, ceramicist and fabric designer

- Born: 11 June 1905; Warsaw, Mazovia, Congress Poland
- Died: 13 March 1991 (aged 85); Rome, Italy
- Education: "Kunstgewerbeschule", Vienna
- Occupations: Painter, ceramics artist and textiles designer
- Spouse: Armin T. Wegner
- Children: Michele "Mischa" Wegner

Irene Kowaliska (11 June 1905 – 13 March 1991) was a painter, ceramics artist and textiles designer, originally from Mazovia (Congress Poland). In 1931 she accepted a job at a German-owned ceramics manufactory in Campania, and during the 1930s it was in Italy that she built and thereafter sustained her career and professional reputation.

== Life ==
=== Provenance and early years ===
Irene Kowaliska was born into a Jewish family at Warsaw in Congress Poland, which between 1815 and 1915 was a semi-detached buffer territory on the western fringes of the Russian Empire. She was three when her father relocated the family, to Vienna. It was in Vienna that Irene grew up. The story is reported that she was still a school girl when, on a visit to the Kunsthistorisches Museum, she stood in front of a mosaic and announced "Das will ich auch können!" ("I want to be able to do that too!"). Her enthusiasm for visual arts was matched by her love of literature, however. This underpinned her friendship with Erika Mitterer, her near contemporary at Vienna's "Lyzeum Luithlen" (secondary school). In 1927, by this time aged 22, Kowaliska graduated from the "Kunstgewerbeschule" (as it was known at that time) in Vienna with a degree that combined mosaic art, sculpture and embroidery. The inclusion of sculpture was based, according to at least one friend, on her admiration for the man teaching it.

Her parents' finances had been devastated by hyperinflation in the early 1920s. Her father's champagne importing business had collapsed. As a teenager and young adult Irene contributed to the family budget by taking work locally as a child carer and home tutor. On the recommendation of one of her professors she embarked on an apprenticeship as a photographer, but this appears never to have been completed. At some point she responded to a newspaper job advertisement as a result of which, in 1929 she was offered and accepted work at the pictures archives collection at one of Germany's largest publishing businesses, Ullstein Verlag in Berlin. With Ullstein she was able to use skills she had already acquired to become a specialist restorer of photograph prints.

=== Berlin ===
In Berlin, though her school friend, the precociously young author Erika Mitterer, who was already well-networked in Berlin's literary circles, Kowaliska met Ina Seidel and her daughter Heilwig: she found herself quickly welcomed into the vibrant world of Berlin's artist-intellectuals more widely. A number of these people, including Seidel, later became notorious as committed supporters of National Socialism or even, in some cases as active party members. Käthe Kollwitz was one among her new friends who did not. Kowaliska would later recall a heart-to-heart between the two of them during which she had weepingly complained about her unsatisfactory career situation and prospects. Disappointingly, Kollwitz seemed strangely unsympathetic: "You have work, food, a room: be grateful. Plenty don't have that!". (Note: "Sie haben Arbeit, Essen, ein Zimmer – seien Sie dankbar, viele haben das nicht!") Another of her new friends in Berlin was the author-poet Armin Theophil Wegner whom, some sixteen years later, she would marry as his second wife.

=== Campania ===
In 1931 Kowaliska was given an opportunity to join a thriving pottery workshop community devoted to producing artistic ceramics at Vietri sul Mare, a short walk along the coast to the west from Salerno. "Industria Ceramica Salernitana" (ICS) had been established by the wealthy German-Lithuanian businessman Max Melamerson and his wife in 1927 and quickly become a magnet for talented ceramic artists from German-speaking central Europe. She arrived with very little money, and the starting salary of 50 lire per week was minimal even at the time, but she found it was enough to live on. (Note: "Era un pessimo stipendio, ma con 200 lire al mese si poteva vivere") The business was managed - apparently loosely - by a fellow expatriate artist, Richard Dölker, who was evidently impressed by her talents as a ceramicist. Very soon following her arrival in March 1931, Kowaliska found herself permitted to produce decorated ceramic ware according to her own designs. Materials and facilities were included in the deal, and for every piece sold she received one third of the selling price. Later that year an exhibition of her work in Vienna achieved o positive a resonance that she was able to return to Vietri with a full order book. She quickly became one of the best-known members of the flourishing "German colony" of creative artists in Vietri. Others included the ceramicist Barbara Margarethe Thewalt-Hannasch (1901–1962), the Bremen-born artist Lisel Oppel, the ceramists Hilde Rauberling and Lothar Eglive and the potter from Dresden, Otto Piesche. There were also a number of Italian ceramicists and other artists working at the "ICS" In 1932 Kowaliska was given her own studio at "Industria Ceramiche Artistiche Meridionali" (ICAM), a neighbouring ceramics business established at Vietri by Vincenzo Pinto (1870 – 1939) back in 1910. At ICAM she took the workshop previously occupied by Barbara Thewalt-Hannasch. Vincenzo Pinto had worked closely with the German artists of the "ICS" ever since they arrived in town, exploiting the commercial opportunities arising from their international connections. By 1932, however, he had handed over daily management of his workshop to a manager and was evidently contemplating retirement. Irene Kowaliska would confide gratefully to her diary, "Dear Don Vincenzo gave me a place where I could work in complete freedom". (Note: "Don Vincenzino mi lasciava un posto dove potevo lavorare liberamente".)

Kowaliska's travels over the next couple of years nevertheless indicate a certain restlessness. She undertook a study trip in Sardinia during the late summer of 1932 and then, in 1933, she relocated to Vallauris in southern France, where she experimented with new techniques. Although she remained at Vallauris for several years, she never came to terms with the firing technologies applied there, and was "unable to achieve the hoped for results". During the first part of 1937 she returned to Vietri and resumed her collaboration with Vincenzo Pinto's "ICAM" business. Towards the end of 1936 or 1937 (sources differ over the year) she set up her own studio in Vietri. By that time Armin T. Wegner had relocated to the little town of Positano, a couple of hours walk to the west along the coast road towards Sorrento and Naples.

=== Armin T. Wegner ===
Armin Wegner was the son of a railway official and a former army officer with a degree in Jurisprudence who, after witnessing death marches in Mesopotamia and what became Syria, emerged from his war-time experiences as a committed pacifist campaigner. More recently, many admirers characterise him as a human rights author and activist. Early in 1933 the Hitler government took power in Berlin. During April 1933 legislation was enacted to remove Jews from public service jobs at every level and the government ordered a boycott of Jewish businesses. (The boycott at this stage was widely ignored.) Many Germans were quietly appalled that antisemitism had been transformed from, a populist mantra of street politicians into a core underpinning of government strategy. Wegner, characteristically, was among those who did something about it. His (in its initial version) six-page open letter to Chancellor Hitler is dated 11 April 1933. Presumably intensified surveillance by the security services followed quickly. Sources differ over whether he was arrested almost at once, in August 1933, or at some point between the two. Following arrest he was interrogated and badly tortured. He was detained successively at the Columbia House (Berlin-Tempelhof), Oranienburg, Börgermoor and Lichtenburg concentration camps. Sources also differ as to whether his release followed of Christmas 1933 or during the first part of 1934, but his total period of detention in Germany was relatively brief. On release, pausing only to make arrangements for his Berlin apartment, he fled to London, where he was reunited with his wife and daughter Sibyl. Together they then fled to Palestine which at that time was administered as a semi-detached territory of the British Empire. By 1936 Armin Wegner had moved on again, this time to Campania (Italy), while his wife, who was Jewish, remained in Palestine. The divorce followed in 1939. By the time he arrived in Italy Wegner was badly traumatised. Kowaliska and Wegner had never completely lost touch, since they had first met up in Berlin in the 1920s. Early in 1934 Kowaliska had made a trip to Berlin in order to help Wegner sort out his Kaiserdamm apartment in west-central Berlin, following his release from the "camp", a task in which his wife was unable to assist because she, being Jewish, had already fled to London. When Wegner left Palestine and came to Campania he stayed, for a time, with Kowaliska at her Vietri apartment. Several sources hint that Kowaliska's presence in Vietri may, indeed, have been the reason Wegner chose to move to southern Italy where, at the stage, German exiles were able to live in relative safety irrespective of their political backgrounds or attitudes to National Socialist race policies.

=== Positano ===
Romance between Kowaliska and Wegner blossomed during the second half of the 1930s. Kowaliska's ceramics continued to find enthusiastic buyers, but it was nevertheless on the basis of generous financial backing that in 1936 she was able to set up her own little ceramics workshop incorporating - importantly - its own kiln. In 1937, at their request, they were visited by Lola Landau, Wegner's wife. But they evidently concluded, between them, that she would never be able to live as part of the artist community of into which Wegner was becoming integrated, and the political clouds were also, by this time, darkening for Jews living in Italy. Lola returned to Palestine. During this period Kowaliska and Wegner undertook a series of exploratory trips. As they came to know the area better, they kept returning to Positano where in 1937 Wegner rented a house. Kowaliska moved in with him and, at his request, she designed and produced a large collection of tiles with which the house was decorated. One of them showed the new name Wegner had chosen for their house: "Casa dei sette venti" (House of the Seven Winds). By 1940 the couple were living as man and wife, though a formal marriage solemnised at the town hall was deferred in order to avoid attracting the attention of the authorities. Sources differ as to whether Armin Wegner and Irene Kowaliska were formally married in 1946. Meanwhile, in December 1941 their son "Mischa" was born.

=== More war ===
War returned in September 1939, when armies under the direction of governments in Germany and the Soviet Union invaded Poland from opposite sides. In June 1940, in a move that was controversial with many at the time, the Italian government signalled a willingness to join in on the German side. The various chemical compounds that Kowaliska needed for the brilliant (and other) colours she used for her ceramic creations became difficult or impossible to obtain. By the time her studio in Vietri was destroyed by bombs in 1943 she had already moved on. For a number of years before the outbreak of war, "Myricae", the well-regarded arts, crafts, furnishings and fashions shop near the Spanish Steps in central Rome, had been urging Kowaliska to print table linen that match the ceramic wares which they were already selling on her behalf. It now turned out that Kowaliska's skills and reputation were readily transferable to traditionally produced fabric prints. In 1940 she moved to Rome and rented a little apartment in which she lived during the daylight hours, and which she used as a makeshift studio during the nights. Armin Wegner had a job as a lecturer in German language and literature at the German Institute in Padua between 1941 and 1943, but was able to make frequent visits to Rome. A couple of years before the war ended, the Wegners were able to return to their Positano home, where they continued to live for more than another decade. The specialist shop in Rome continued to be a major outlet for Kowaliska's fabric designs, but after the war was over she was able to find additional local retailers who were delighted to sell her designer textiles in the Campania region, as the tourists began to return during the 1950s. Meanwhile there were also niche opportunities. Two aristocratic evacuees from Naples, a Principessa Caraffa and a Marchesa De Ruggero, arrived in Positano and set up a couple of fashion boutiques. They commissioned Kowaliska to design and produce beachwear which they sold. Branded as "Moda Positanese", the designs captured the spirit of the times and enjoyed significant commercial success with visitors to Positano and the surrounding region.

=== Rome ===
In 1956 the couple relocated to Rome. Their new home was an apartment in the "Viale Quattro Venti" in a quarter of the city to the south of the Vatican. The apartment was linked to a substantial studio where Irene had space to work not just on her fabrics, but was able also to branch out into designing tapestries, embroidery and book covers, along with a succession of niche trinkets, among which some of the more memorable were glass medallions incorporating little icon paintings and Bergamot-jars fabricated according to a secret process that had been confided exclusively to her by "a Sicilian artist". The core focus of her business continued to involve print designs on fabrics, however. During the 1950s and 1960s she benefitted from a renaissance in fabric design as a "must-have feature" of city life. The "Myricae" store in Rome which had so effectively supported her in Rome since the 1940s was also able to ride same trend, and opened a second store in one of the most lucrative shopping streets in Milan. It became popular among the expanding fashion conscious middle classes to incorporate fabric designs by Kowaliska in interior decorations, be it for blankets, curtains, drapes and even, in some cases, wall papers. Increasingly her fabric prints were reproduced industrially and sold by the meter. That in turn served to support continuing demand for her prints on items of clothing.

=== Later years ===
During the next few decades Irene Kowaliska became an increasingly frequent presence at exhibitions and trade fairs, together with her work. On the international stage, she represented Italy at congresses of the World Crafts Council after 1964. In Campania she is celebrated as one of the most important figures in the twentieth century rebirth of the ceramics industry in Vietri and Positano.

Armin T. Wegner died at Rome in 1978: he was 91. Irene Kowaliska was 85 in 1991 when she, too, died in Rome.
