= Landa =

Landa may refer to:

- Landa (surname)
- Landa, Álava, a village in Basque Country, Spain
- Landa, North Dakota, United States
- Laṇḍā, a class of scripts in Northern India
- Lanzhou University, a national public university in Lanzhou, Gansu, China

== See also ==
- Landa de Matamoros, Mexico
- Lahnda, a group of language varieties also known as Western Punjabi
- Lamda (disambiguation)
