= Ernst Müller-Scheessel =

German painter

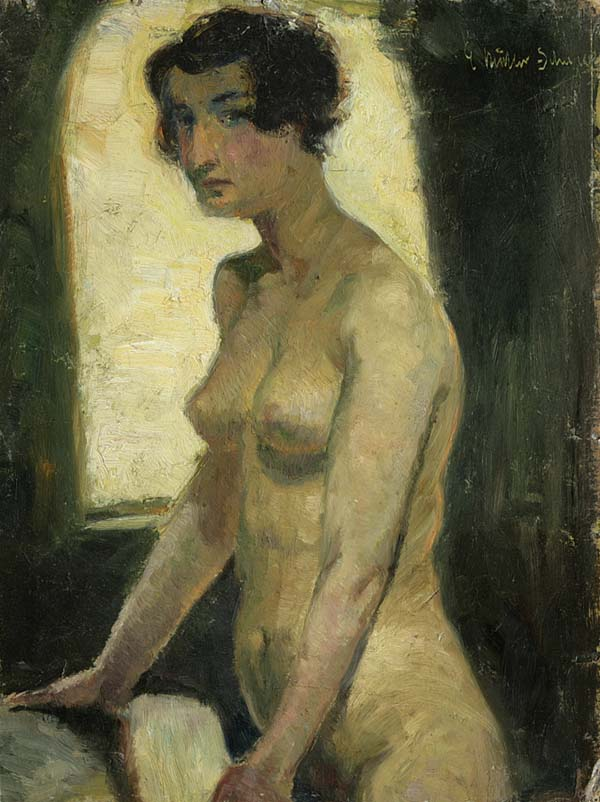
- Stehender weiblicher Akt; Naked woman standing Ernst Müller-Scheessel
- Born: 24 April 1863; Scheeßel, Kingdom of Hanover
- Died: 1 December 1936; Bremen, Germany
- Occupations: Artist; Arts teacher Arts entrepremeur
- Spouse: Emilie Roselius (1878-1962)
- Parent(s): Adolf Conrad Müller (1811-); Marie Jakobine Zahn (1827-1899)

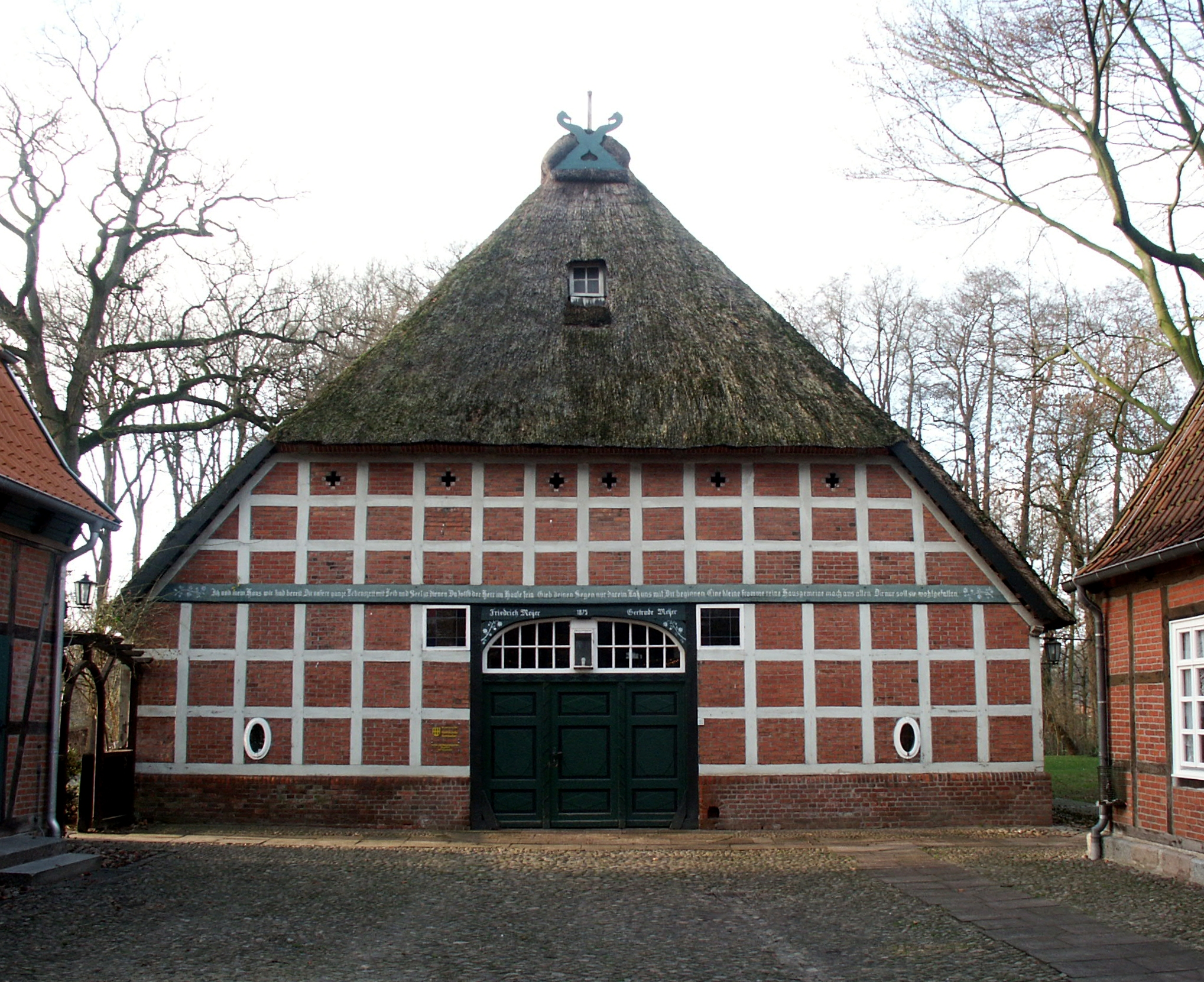
The Scheeßel Meyerhof which Ernst Müller-Scheessel converted into a "Kunstgewerbehaus" (gallery-showroom) in 1908

Ernst Müller-Scheessel (24 April 1863 - 11 December 1936) was a German artist and a co-founder of the "Bremer Kunstlerbund" (".... Artists' Association"). He also taught for some time at the "Kunstgewerbeschule" ("Applied Arts Academy") in Bremen.

== Biography ==
Ernst Heinrich Adolf Ferdinand Müller was born at Scheeßel (Rotenburg) in the Kingdom of Hanover, a short distance to the east of Bremen and to the north of Hannover, the seventh of his parents' nine recorded children. Adolf Conrad Müller (1811-), his father, was a businessman who at one stage entered into an ill-starred partnership with his wife's brother, Ernst Müller's uncle, Julius Zahn. While he was growing up the family relocated in connection with his father's work, and the second part of his childhood was spent in the (at that time separate and completely rural) village of Beeke (Obernkirchen), some fifteen minutes to the west of Hannover by train. Ernst Müller attended the art college in Hannover and the Applied Arts Academy in Berlin. In parallel with his academic studies he undertook and completed an apprenticeship in glass painting.

Müller emigrated to Canada in 1888. In Canada he worked, principally in the churches, as a glass painter. Returning to Germany in 1896, he spent a year in Munich in order to study with Anton Ažbe. The next year he moved back to the north, settling in the rapidly expanding port-city of Bremen. It was also in 1897 that "Ernst Müller" formally changed his name to "Ernst Müller-Scheessel".

In 1903 Ernst Müller-Scheessel married Emilie Roselius (1878-1962). The bride was a younger sister to the coffee-baron and arts-patron, Ludwig Roselius. Sources indicate that for Müller-Scheessel the marriage represented an upward move, both within the hierarchy of the flourishing Bremen arts establishment and among Bremen's haute-bourgeoisie more generally. Müller-Scheessel had earlier been a co-founder of the influential regional magazine "Niedersachsen", to which he was regularly contributing illustrations. In 1908 he converted and opened the "Kunstgewerbehaus" (loosely, "Arts and Crafts centre") in a "Meyerhof" (traditional farmhouse-barn building) at his birth-town of Scheeßel. Although he used the building to exhibit his paintings. There were regular exhibitions till 1934. The centre's more important commercial purpose was as a showroom location for his furniture designs and those of other artists associated with the nearby Worpswede artists' colony. When an order was received, the commission was then taken over by one of a number of Scheeßel craftsmen.

In 1910 he set up a studio in the Roselius building "Roselius-Haus" along the Böttcherstraße, then as now the artists' quarter of central Bremen. That was where, in 1913, he held his first exhibition. Müller-Scheessel was a prolific artist: the exhibition featured around 150 works in oil, watercolour and gouache, along with some of his furniture designs. In 1918, with the Fischerhude artist Fritz Cobet, Müller-Scheessel was co-founder of the "Bremer Kunstlerbund" ("Bremen Artists' Association"). The next year he took a job at the newly opened Bremen adult education college ("Bremer Volkshochschule""), teaching North German Applied Arts. In parallel, at this time he was teaching watercolour painting and glass painting at the Bremen "Applied Arts Academy ("Kunstgewerbeschule").

On 13 October 1928 the Roselius building "Roselius-Haus" re-opened following a major refurbishment planned and overseen by Müller-Scheessel. Since then it has been primarily a museum of North German "Plattdeutsch" culture and folk arts. In 1934 the city senate granted him a full professorship, following which he taught as a professor at the "Kunstgewerbeschule" ("Applied Arts Academy").

On 11 December 1936 Ernst Müller-Scheesser suffered a fatal heart attack.
