= Landor =

Landor may refer to:

== People ==
- Landor (surname)

== Places ==
- Landor River, a river in Western Australia
- Landor Station, a pastoral lease in Western Australia
- Lándor, the Hungarian name for Nandra village, Bichiș Commune, Mureș County, Romania

== Other uses ==
- Landor (company), a global branding agency
- A piece in the game Stratego: Legends by Avalon Hill

== See also ==
- Landauer, a surname
- Landore
