= Landay (surname) =

Landay is a surname. Notable people with the surname include:

- James Landay, American computer scientist and academic
- Vincent Landay, Canadian-American film producer
- William Landay (born 1963), American novelist

== See also ==
- Landa (surname)
- Landau (surname)
