= Rebecca Landa =

American speech-language pathologist

- Born: 1955 (age 70–71)
- Other name: Rebecca Jean Moellman-Landa
- Education: Towson University; Pennsylvania State University; University of Washington
- Scientific career
- Fields: Speech-language pathology, neuropsychology, autism research
- Workplaces: Johns Hopkins School of Medicine; Kennedy Krieger Institute

Rebecca Jean Moellman-Landa (born 1955) is an American speech-language pathologist specializing in neuropsychology and autism research. She is the founder and director of the center for autism and related disorders at the Kennedy Krieger Institute. Landa is a professor of psychiatry and behavioral sciences at the Johns Hopkins School of Medicine.

== Life ==
Landa was born in 1955. She earned a B.S. from Towson University in 1977. Landa completed a M.S. at the Pennsylvania State University in 1978. She earned a Ph.D. from the University of Washington in 1985. Her dissertation was titled, Effectiveness of language elicitation tasks with two-year-olds. Landa conducted postdoctoral research in psychiatric genetics at the Johns Hopkins University.

Landa is the founder, vice president, and director of the Center for Autism and Related Disorders at the Kennedy Krieger Institute. She is a professor of psychiatry and behavioral sciences at the Johns Hopkins School of Medicine. She investigates neuropsychological, learning, and communication processes in people with autism across their lifespan.
