= Lambda (novel) =

2022 science fiction novel

- UK
- Author: David Musgrave
- Language: English
- Genre: Science fiction
- Publication date: 2022

Lambda is a 2022 science fiction novel written by British artist and author David Musgrave.

== Overview ==
A police officer connects with a strange race of aquatic humans.
