= Lambda (olive oil) =

Greek luxury olive oil brand

- Product type: Olive Oil
- Current owner: Speiron (Athens, Greece)
- Introduced: 2007
- Website: www.speironcompany.com

Lambda (stylized λ /lambda/) is a Greek luxury olive oil brand, produced by Speiron company, founded in 2007 by Greek entrepreneur Giorgos Kolliopoulos. It is branded as the first luxury olive oil in the world. Its brand name originates from the Greek word λάδι (ladi) which means oil in Greek.

== Description ==
Wallpaper magazine mentions the product's stylized packaging. The product is marketed to affluent consumers through exclusive distribution channels and word of mouth. It is available in several countries as well as sold online. In 2011, the company signed a direct vendor agreement with Harrods.

- Acidity: Below 0.3
- Packaging: 100 ml. & 500 ml. glass bottle - gift box packaging
- Specifications: Cold extraction, blend of Koroneiki olive varieties.

In October 2010, the company announced the launch of the Bespoke Lambda, which they call the first personalized olive oil and the most expensive globally.

In August 2026, an academic case study examined Lambda as an example of strategic category creation in the luxury food sector.
