= Landay, Helmand =

Town in Afghanistan

Landay
- Location in Afghanistan
- Coordinates: 30°31′44″N 63°43′47″E
- Country: Afghanistan
- Province: Helmand Province

Population
  - Total: 1,652
- Time zone: UTC+4:30

Landay is a town in Helmand Province, southwestern Afghanistan. The population is approximately 1,652.

The two tallest mountains in Landay are the Noshaq (Nowshak) and the Shakhaur (Shakhawr).

== See also ==
- Helmand Province
