= Ford Landau (Australia) =

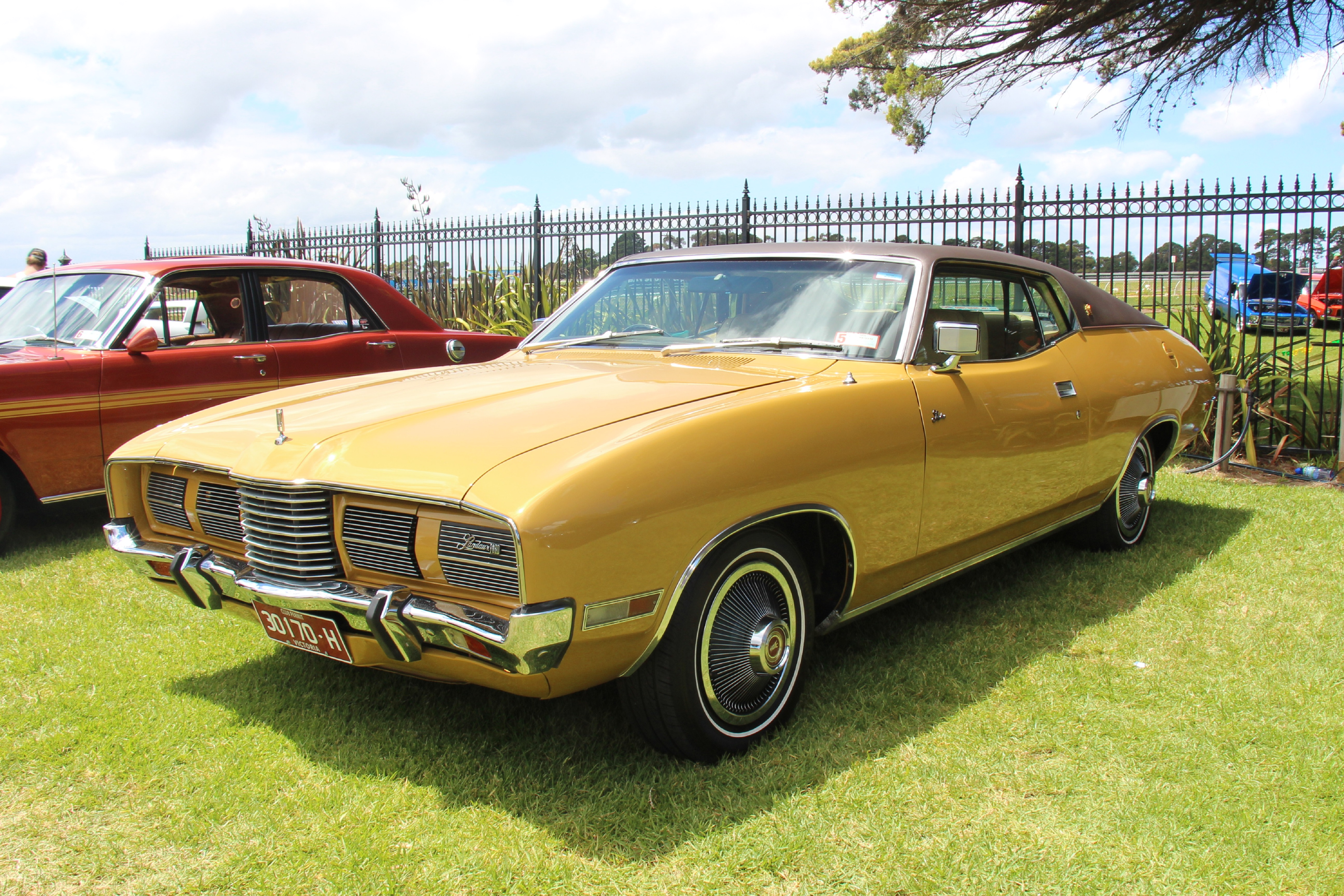

Overview
- Manufacturer: Ford Australia
- Production: 1973–1976

Body and chassis
- Class: Full-size car
- Body style: 2-door hardtop coupé
- Related: Ford Falcon; Ford LTD

Powertrain
- Engine: 5.8 L (351 cu in) V8

The Ford Landau is a car which was produced by Ford Australia from 1973 to 1976.

Released in August 1973, the Ford Landau was based on the Australian XA/XB series Ford Falcon but shared its frontal and rear appearance and luxury features with the Australian P5 series Ford LTD limousine, another Australian design which was released at the same time as the Landau. Although the official Ford Australia Model code for the Landau is "JG70" it was often informally called "P5 Landau."

The Landau was available only as a two-door hardtop coupe and shared its running gear and 111 inches (2,800 mm) wheelbase with the XB Falcon GT hardtop. It was further differentiated from the Falcon with deeper C-pillars and squared-off rear side windows, much like the 1971-1973 U.S. Ford Mustang coupe; and a vinyl roof. Both the Landau and LTD shared the grille and "spoked" hubcaps of the 1972 Ford Thunderbird.

The Landau was powered by an Australian-built low compression version of Ford's 351 cubic inch (5752cc) Cleveland V8 engine with a power output of 290 bhp (220 kW) at 5000 rpm. Its transmission was a three-speed “T-Bar SelectShift Cruisomatic” unit, allowing a choice of manual or fully automatic gear changing. Four wheel disc brakes were fitted, making the Landau and its similarly equipped LTD stablemate the first Australian-built cars with this feature.

The high levels of standard equipment fitted to the Landau meant that only two items were offered as optional equipment: a cassette deck, and full leather interior trim. This factor, combined with the performance orientated mechanical specifications of the Landau meant that it never had a direct rival in the Australian marketplace. Plans to update the original P5 series Landau with the frontal styling of the forthcoming P6 series LTD resulted in the building of a P6 Landau design study, but the facelifted model was not put into production. The Landau was discontinued when the new LTD was released in 1976, after a total production run of 1385 vehicles, although correspondence obtained from Ford Australia in 2018 indicated there had been a total 1402 built.

The relationship between the Landau and the Falcon hardtop can be compared to that of the Ford's American luxury marque Mercury’s Cougar, a luxury variant of the Mustang.

Ford Australia P5 Landau

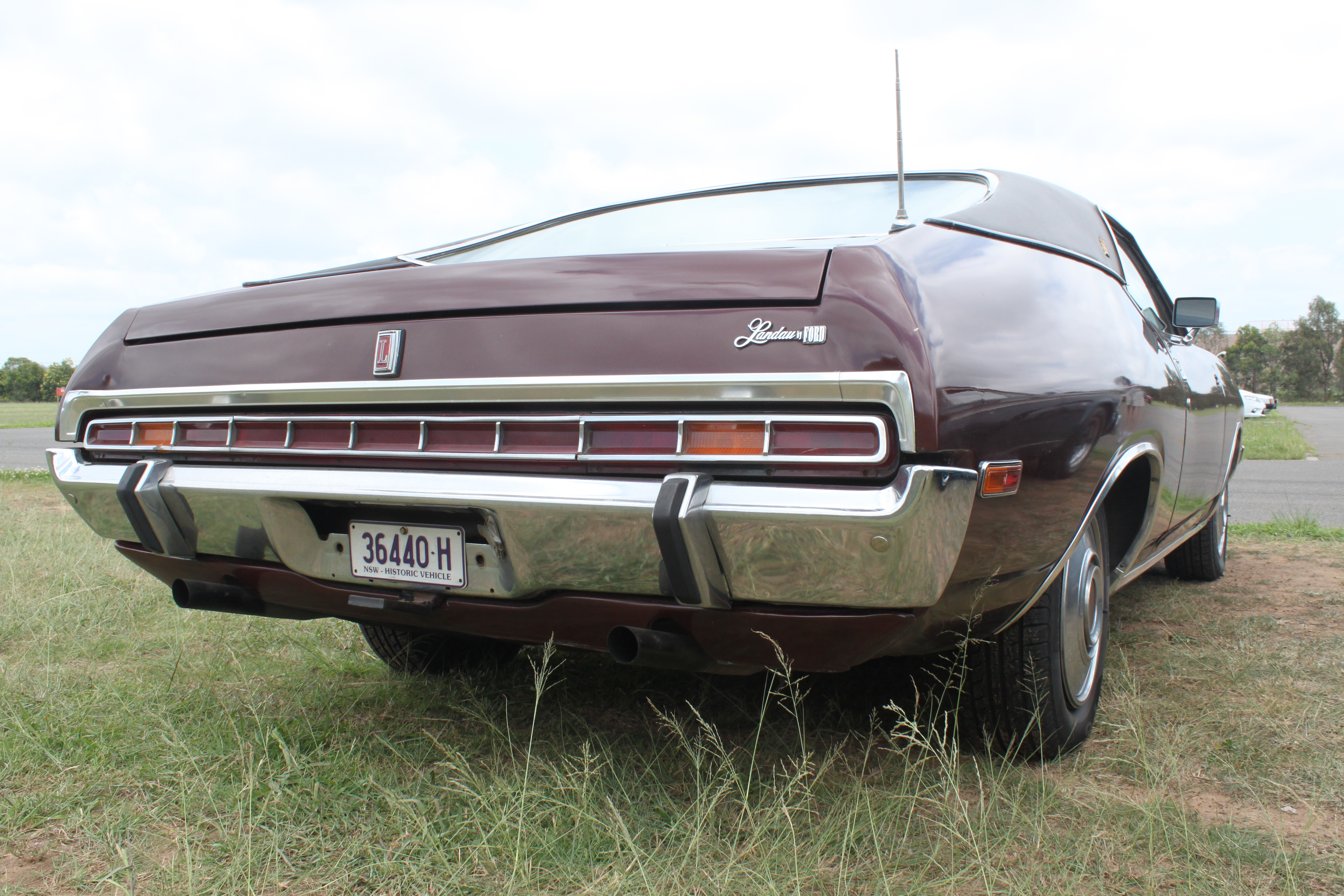
The Landau shared the same strip tail lights as the LTD sedan

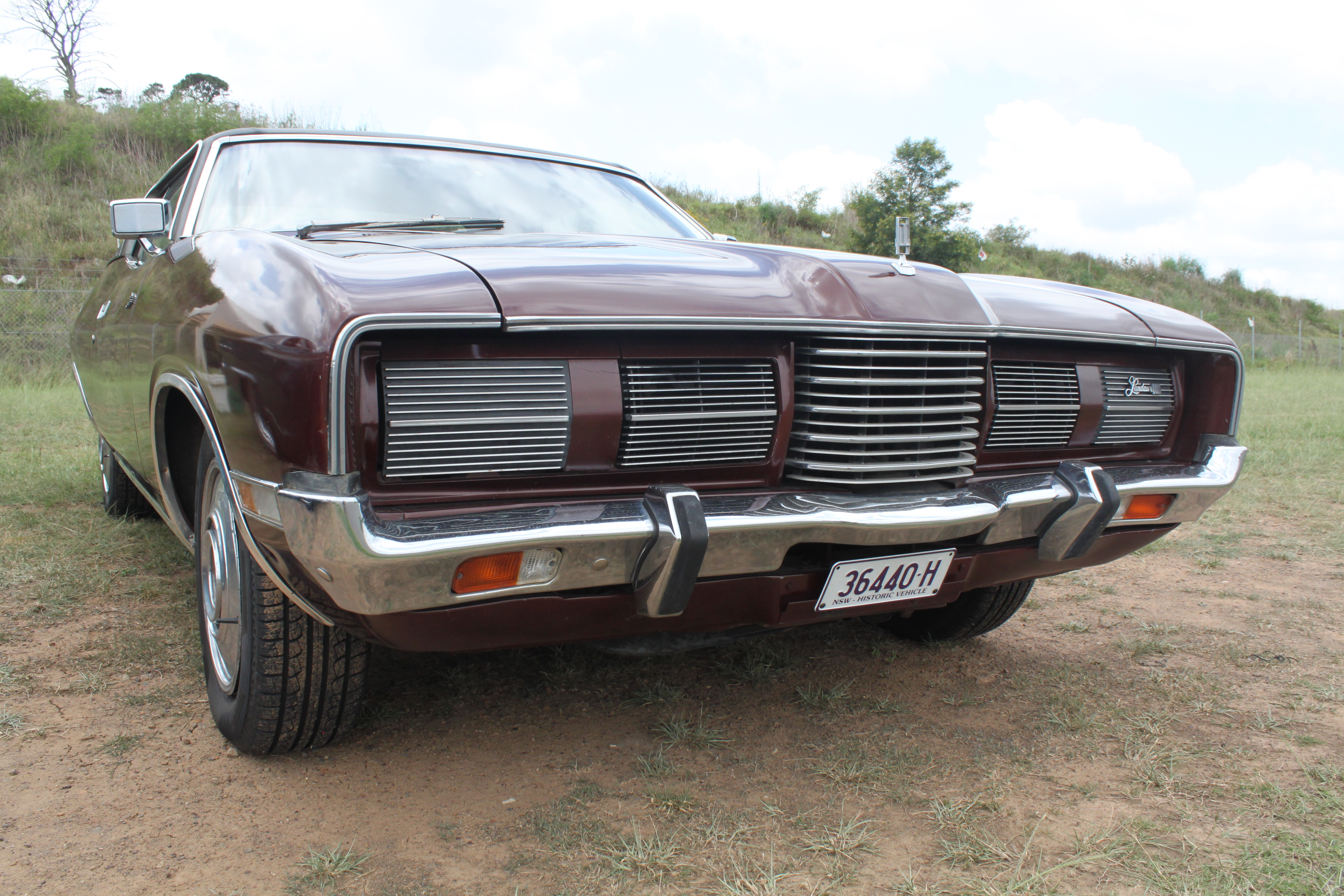
JG70 Landau from the front with vacuum-actuated headlights

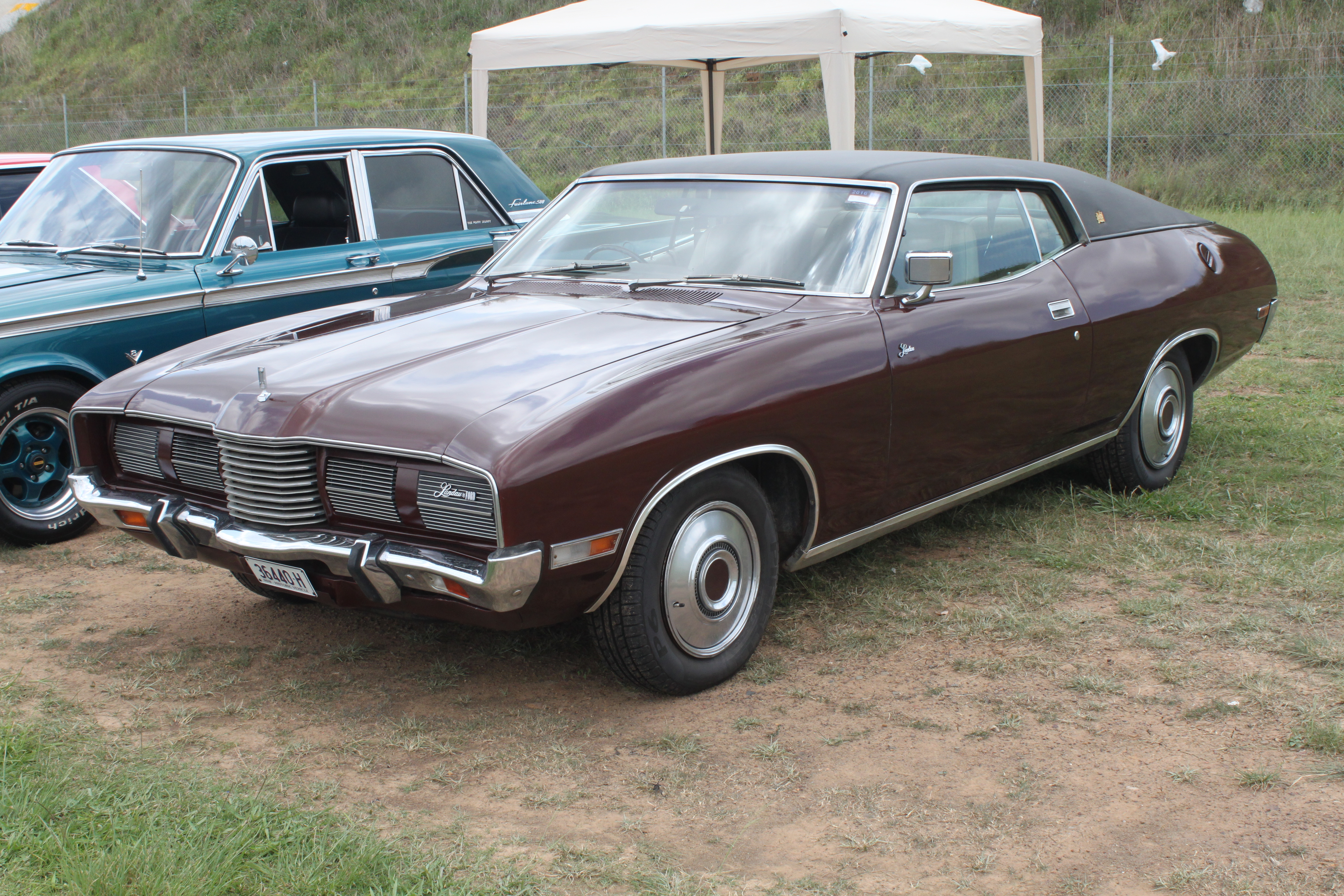
1974 Australian JG70 Ford Landau

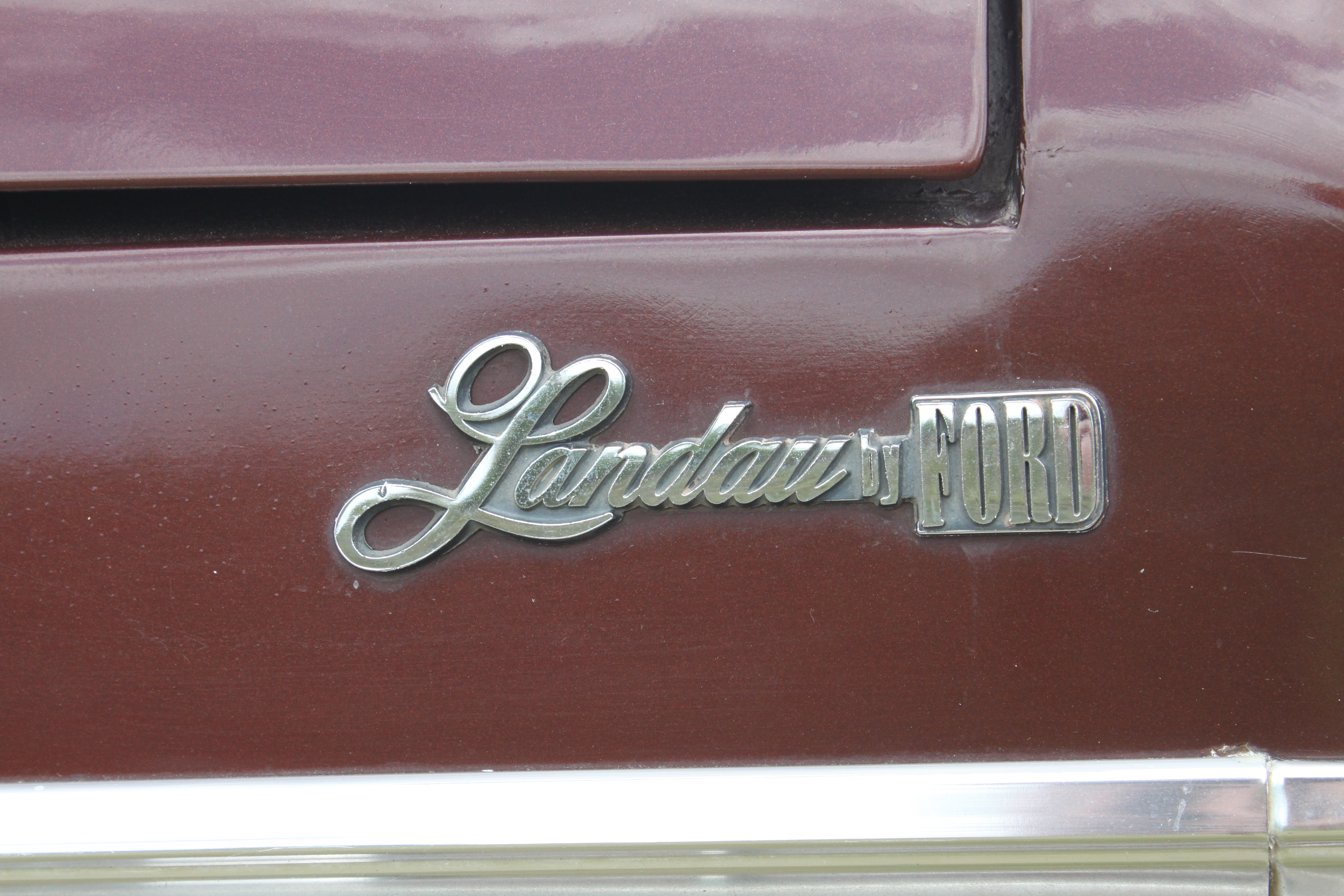
"Landau by FORD"
