= Lambda (unit) =

Unit of volume

lambda
- Unit system: Non-SI metric unit
- Unit of: Volume
- Symbol: λ

Conversions
1 λ in ...	... is equal to ...
- SI base units: 10^{−9} m^{3}
- Units accepted for use with SI: 1 μL

Lambda (written λ, in lowercase) is a non-SI unit of volume equal to 10^{−9} m^{3}, 1 cubic millimetre (mm^{3}) or 1 microlitre (μL). Introduced by the BIPM in 1880, the lambda has been used in chemistry and in law for measuring volume, but its use is not recommended.

This use of λ parallels the pre-SI use of μ on its own for a micrometre and γ for a microgram. Although the use of λ is deprecated, some clinical laboratories continue to use it. The standard abbreviation μL for a microlitre has the disadvantage that it can be misread as mL (a unit 1000 times larger). In pharmaceutical use, no abbreviation for a microlitre is considered safe. The recommended practice is to write "microlitre" in full.
