= Polina Landa =

Russian physicist

- Полина Соломоновна Ланда
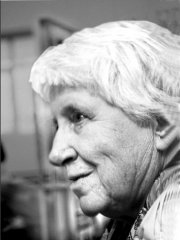
- Polina Landa, from a 2010 publication
- Born: Polina Solomonovna Landa; February 15, 1931; Kyiv
- Died: September 21, 2022 (aged 91); Moscow
- Occupation: Physicist

Polina Solomonovna Landa (Russian: Полина Соломоновна Ланда; February 15, 1931 – September 21, 2022) was a Soviet physicist.

== Early life and education ==
Landa was born in Kyiv, the daughter of Solomon V. Landa. Her family was Jewish. She graduated from high school in Moscow in 1948. She earned a master's degree in physics from Moscow State University in 1953, and completed her doctoral studies there in 1960; her dissertation research, "On the stability of self-oscillatory systems and automatic control systems in the presence of random influences", was written under advisor Sergei Pavlovich Strelkov. She defended a second dissertation, "Investigation of the dynamic and statistical characteristics of optical quantum generators and amplifiers", in 1972.

== Career ==
Landa joined the faculty of Moscow State University in 1956, and remained there as a researcher and professor until she retired in 2020. She taught, did research on oscillations, with applications in plasma, lasers, and acoustics, and supervised twelve doctoral students through to the completion of their degrees. She was a visiting researcher at Lancaster University in 1999 and 2003. She was a member of the Russian National Committee on Theoretical and Applied Mechanics.

== Publications ==
Landa published dozens of articles and several monographs from her research. Her work appeared in Russian-language and English-language journals, including Physics-Uspekhi, Soviet Journal of Quantum Electronics, Chaos, Solitons, and Fractals, Physical Review E, International Journal of Bifurcation and Chaos, Biological Cybernetics, and Physics Reports. She contributed four articles to The Encyclopedia of Nonlinear Science (2006).

=== Monographs ===
- Wave and Fluctuation Processes in Lasers (1974, with S. G. Zeiger, Y. L. Klimontovich, E. G. Lariontsev, and E. E. Fradkin)
- Self-Oscillations in Systems with Finite Number of Degrees of Freedom (1980)
- Self-Oscillations in Distributed Systems (1983)
- Stochastic and Chaotic Oscillations (1987, with Yuri Neimark)
- Nonlinear Oscillations and Waves in Dynamical Systems (1996)
- Regular and Chaotic Oscillations (2001)

=== Articles ===
- "Natural fluctuations in lasers" (1972, with Y. L. Klimontovich and A. S. Kovalev)
- "Self-locking of laser modes" (1977, with V. A. Vygodin)
- "Ionization waves in low-temperature plasmas" (1980, with N. A. Miskinova and Y. V. Ponamarev)
- "Self-oscillatory systems with high-frequency energy sources" (1989, with Y. B. Duboshinskii)
- "Synchronizing the chaotic oscillations by external force" (1991, with George I. Dykman and Yuri Neimark)
- "Noise-induced phase transitions in a pendulum with a randomly vibrating suspension axis" (1996, with A. A. Zaikin)
- "Universality of oscillation theory laws. types and role of mathematical models" (1997)
- "Turbulence and Coherent Structures in Subsonic Submerged Jets: Control of the Turbulence" (1999, with A. A. Zaikin, A. S. Ginevsky, and Y. V. Vlasov)
- "Changes in the dynamical behavior of nonlinear systems induced by noise" (2000, with Peter V. E. McClintock)
- "Self-oscillations in ring Toda chains with negative friction" (2001, with W. Ebeling and V. G. Ushakov)
- "A model for the speed of memory retrieval" (2003, with Alexander Kaplan and Elena Zhukovskaya)
- "Development of turbulence in subsonic submerged jets" (2004, with P. V. E. McClintock)
- "Delusions versus reality in some physics problems: theory and experiment" (2009, with Dmitrii I. Tributskov and Vladimir A. Gusev)
- "Nonlinear systems with fast and slow motions. Changes in the probability distribution for fast motions under the influence of slower ones" (2013, with P. V. E. McClintock)

== Personal life ==
Landa died in 2022, at the age of 91, in Moscow.
