= Landauer =

Landauer is a surname, originally referring to somebody from Landau. It may refer to:

- Berthold Landauer (died 1430s), German painter
- Gustav Landauer (1870–1919), German anarchist, writer, and critic
- Karl Landauer (12 October 1887 – 27 January 1945) was a German psychoanalyst
- Kurt Landauer (1884–1961), German football official
- M. H. Landauer (1808–1841), German rabbi and writer on Jewish mysticism
- Robert S. Landauer (1924–2004), American scientist specializing in radiation measurement
- Rolf Landauer (1927–1999), German-American physicist
- Samuel Landauer (1846–1937), German orientalist and librarian
- Thomas Landauer (1932–2014), American professor of psychology
- Walter Landauer (1910–1983), Austrian pianist best known as half of the Rawicz and Landauer piano duo

== See also ==
- Landau (surname)
- Landauer's principle
- Landor (disambiguation)
