= Eugen Landau =

German Jewish banker and philanthropist

Eugen Landau (March 17, 1852 – February 20, 1935) was a German Jewish banker and philanthropist.

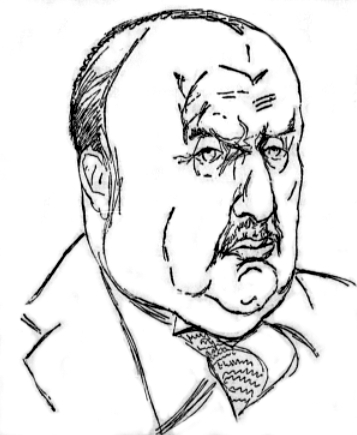
Portrait published in the Vossische Zeitung, 1929

== Life ==
Landau was born in Breslau, Prussia on March 17, 1852. His father Jacob Landau owned a Berlin bank that was one of the largest banks in Germany in the late 19th century.

Landau studied law and economics at the University of Berlin and the University of Bern, after which he joined his father's business. In 1879, he founded a Silesian railway company. He then participated in the organization of important industrial concerns, including the mining company Königs- und Laurahütte, the Schultheiss-Patzenhofer Brauerei (the largest brewery in Germany), and the electrical company AEG (which was directed by Emil Rathenau and Walther Rathenau). As a partner in his father's banking firm, he established close connections with city authorities in Berlin and made the bank one of the principal agents in arranging loans to Berlin for its development. He also played a large part the establishment of the National Bank fuer Deutschland and its mergers with Breslau Disconto-Bank and the Bayerische Bank. During World War I, he served as a major in Germany's Landwehr (Territorial Reserve), the highest rank a non-converted Jew reached until then. He served as an honorary consul-general in Berlin, and he used that position to strengthen relations between Spain and Germany.

Landau was deeply involved in Jewish affairs and philanthropies, subsidizing various Jewish institutions in Berlin. He was a director of the orphan asylum Baruch Auerbach'sches Waisenhaus and vice-president of the German Pro-Palästina Committee and the Keren Hayesod in Germany, which he was a founder of. He also supported the Juedische Altershilfe, aid for the aged. He founded the Hilfsverein der Deutschen Juden with Dr. Paul Nathan and James Simon, and served as its first president until he retired to focus on his growing business interests. He remained the organization's first Vice-President.

In 1899, Emperor Wilhelm II decorated Landau with the Order of the Crown, Third Class. On his 80th birthday, the Berlin Chamber of Industry and Commerce awarded him their Gold Medal, their highest distinction, for his service to German industry and commerce. His wife was a daughter of City Councillor Magnus. His stepsons were Dr. Walter Sobernheim, Dr. Kurt Sobernheim, and Professor Dr. Moritz Sobernheim, who were all active workers in Jewish public affairs in Germany.

Landau died in Berlin on February 20, 1935. He was buried in the Jewish cemetery on Schönhauser Allee.
