= David E. Landau =

American lawyer and academic

David Evan Landau
- Born: December 20, 1978 (age 46)
- Education: Harvard University (AB, PhD); Harvard Law School (JD)
- Occupation: Law Professor
- Employer: Florida State University College of Law

David Evan Landau (born December 20, 1978) is an American lawyer. He is a professor at Florida State University College of Law.

He received his A.B., J.D., and Ph.D. from Harvard University.

== International Work ==
Professor Landau's work has been cited by the high courts of several countries, including the Supreme Court of Israel, the Supreme Court of Canada, the Constitutional Court of Colombia, the Constitutional Tribunal of Chile, the Supreme Federal Tribunal of Brazil, and the Supreme Court of Kenya. Professor Landau received a Fulbright specialist grant to Chile in 2022, during that country's ongoing constitution-making process. In 2011, he served as a consultant on constitutional issues for the Truth and Reconciliation Commission of Honduras.

== Florida State University College of Law ==
At Florida State University College of Law, Professor Landau has taught Constitutional Law I, Comparative Constitutional Law, Public International Law, Civil Procedure, Conflict of Laws, and International Litigation and Arbitration. He has twice won a University Graduate Teaching Award, in 2012-2013 and 2019–2020. He also serves as Associate Dean for International Programs, and in that capacity supervises the graduate LL.M. Program in American Law for Foreign Lawyers, the Certificate Program in International Law for J.D. students, and the College of Law's summer program at Oxford University.
