= Lamda =

Lamda may refer to:

- Lambda, a Greek letter
- LAMDA, the London Academy of Music and Dramatic Art
- LaMDA, a group of neural language models

== See also ==
- Lambda (disambiguation)
