= Armin T. Wegner =

German pacifist, writer and poet (1886–1978)

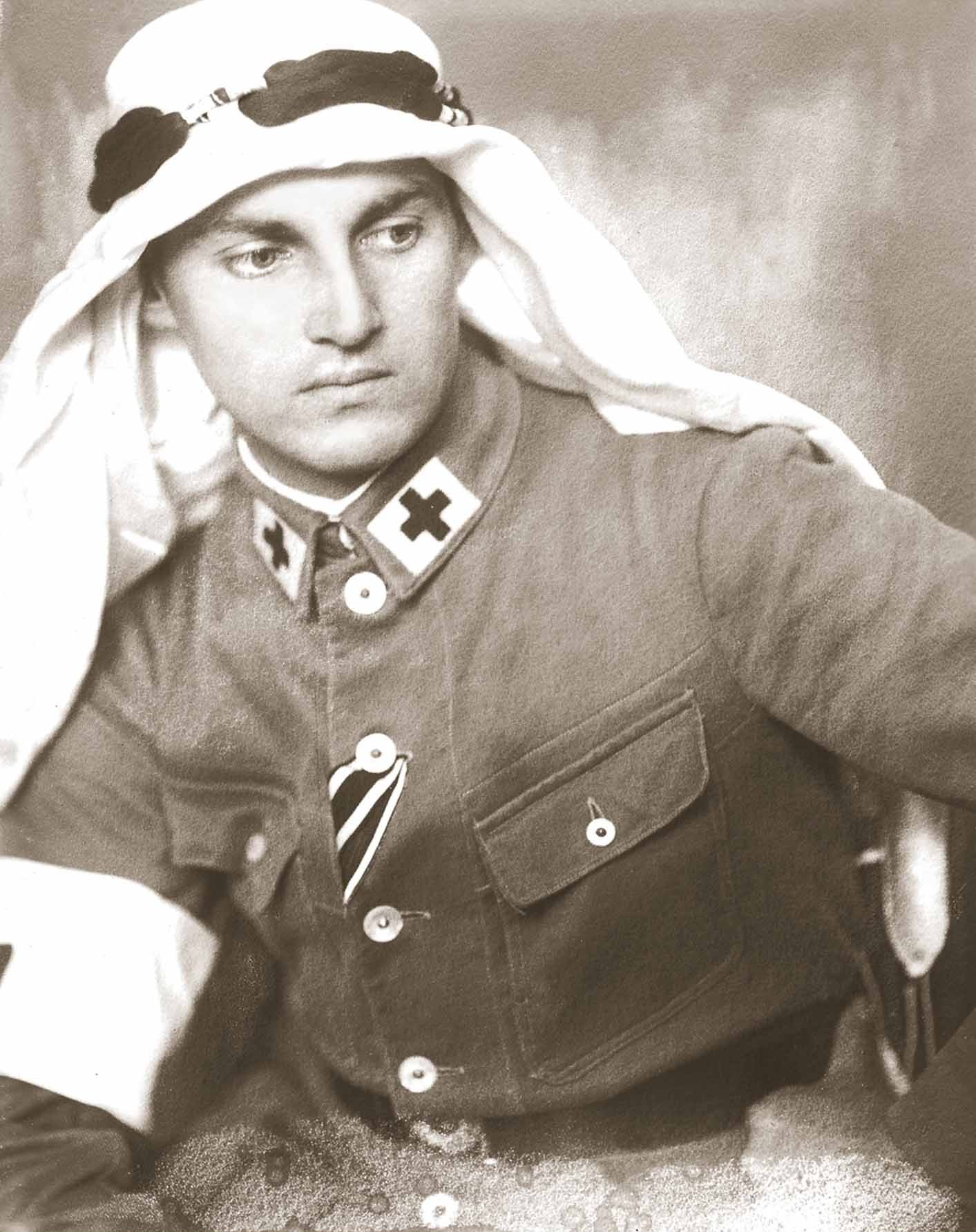
- Wegner in uniform as a young man
- Born: Armin Theophil Wegner; October 16, 1886; Elberfeld, Rhine Province, German Empire
- Died: May 17, 1978 (aged 91); Rome, Italy
- Spouse: Lola Landau (1920-1939)
- Military career
- Allegiance: German Empire
- Branch: German Sanitary Corps
- Service years: 1914–1916
- Rank: Second lieutenant
- Awards: Iron Cross
- Other work: (in German) Am Kreuzweg Der Welten (Berlin, 1982)

Armin Theophil Wegner (October 16, 1886 – May 17, 1978) was a German soldier and medic in World War I, a prolific author, and a human rights activist. Stationed in the Ottoman Empire during World War I, Wegner was a witness to the Armenian genocide and the photographs he took documenting the plight of the Armenians today "comprises the core of witness images of the Genocide."

In the years following World War I, Wegner also voiced his opposition, at great risk to his own life, to the antisemitic policies of the Nazi regime. In 1933, he authored an impassioned plea to Adolf Hitler on behalf of German Jews. He suggested that the persecution of the Jews was not just a question of "the fate of our Jewish brothers alone, [but also] the fate of Germany." Noting that he was writing the letter as a proud German who could himself trace his Prussian familial roots back to the time of the Crusades, Wegner asked Hitler what would become of Germany if it continued its persecution of Jews. Answering his own question, Wegner declared, "There is no Fatherland without justice!" He was persecuted by the Nazi regime and fled after being released from a concentration camp.

After leaving Germany, Wegner lived the rest of his life in Italy. He was later recognized for his anti-genocide efforts, including recognition by Yad Vashem as Righteous Among the Nations. His story and his pictures have featured in multiple later efforts to document the Armenian genocide.

== Life ==
=== Education ===
Wegner was born in the town of Elberfeld, Rhine Province (now in Wuppertal) in the German Empire. Educated at first in Striegau (today Strzegom), he later pursued further study in Zürich, Breslau, and Berlin. Upon completing his doctoral studies in law, he joined the armed forces.

=== World War I ===
Constantly in fear of being beaten and violated, incapable of protecting themselves or their children, Armenian mothers trudge through the hot desert toward Syria, 1915, Foto by Wegner

Wegner joined the German army at the outbreak of World War I, serving as a medic in Poland during the winter of 1914–1915, where he was awarded the Iron Cross for rendering care under fire. He rose to the rank of second lieutenant in the German Sanitary Corps, which was attached to the Ottoman Sixth Army. Wegner was part of a German detachment led by Colmar Freiherr von der Goltz, which was stationed along the Baghdad Railway in Syria and Mesopotamia; here, Wegner witnessed the death marches of Armenians during the height of the Armenian genocide.

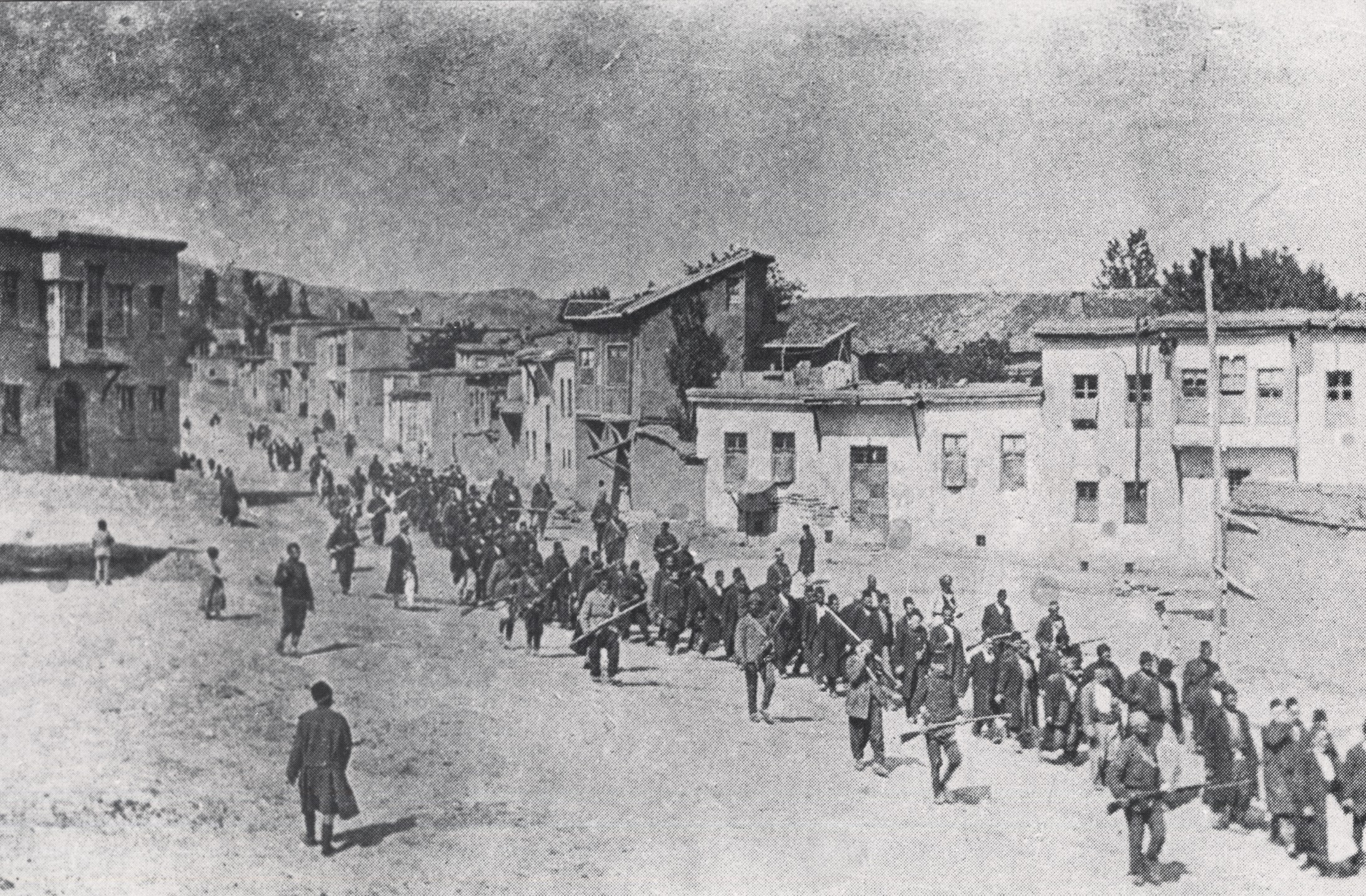
Armenians being led away by armed guards from Harpoot, where the educated and the influential of the city were selected to be massacred at the nearest suitable site, May 1915, Foto by Wegner

Disobeying orders intended to smother news of the massacres (as the Ottoman Empire and Germany were allies), he gathered information on the massacres, collected documents, annotations, notes, and letters and took hundreds of photographs in the Armenian deportation camps in Deir ez-Zor, which later served to evidence the extent of the atrocities to which the Ottoman Armenians were subjected. At the Ottoman command's request, Wegner was eventually arrested by the Germans and recalled to Germany. While some of his photographs were confiscated and destroyed, he succeeded in smuggling out many negatives hidden in his belt.

Wegner protested against the atrocities perpetrated by the Ottoman government against the Armenian people in an open letter, published in the Berliner Tageblatt, submitted to American President Woodrow Wilson at the peace conference of 1919. The letter made a case for the creation of an independent Armenian state. Also in 1919, Wegner published Der Weg ohne Heimkehr (The Road of No Return), a collection of letters he had written during what he deemed the "martyrdom" (Martyrium) of the Anatolian Armenians.

=== Weimar period ===
In Germany after the war, Wegner married author Lola Landau, and became an activist espousing pacifism. His efforts during the aftermath of World War I and the fall of the Ottoman Empire explicitly advocated a separate Armenian nation as a path to reconciliation, which raised difficult political questions. Likewise, Wegner tried to ascribe culpability to the Young Turk regime rather than the Turkish people as a whole.

In 1921 Wegner testified at the trial of Soghomon Tehlirian, the Ottoman Armenian who had killed Talat Pasha in Berlin. Wegner's role was only to confirm the scope and horror of the Armenian experience during the events that later became known as the Armenian Genocide. Talat Pasha, the former Minister of the Interior of the Ottoman Empire, had been sentenced to death in absentia for orchestrating the Armenian massacres; Tehlirian, though he killed the former Ottoman administrator in broad daylight in front of several eyewitnesses, was found not guilty on the grounds of temporary insanity. The documents of the sensational trial were collected into a book, Justicier du génocide armènien: le procès de Tehlirian, for which Wegner authored the preface.

In 1922 Wegner published Der Schrei von Ararat (The Scream from Ararat), an appeal for the rights of surviving Armenians. Toward the mid-1920s, Wegner reached the peak of his popularity as a writer and as a co-creator of German Expressionism. In 1927–8, he and his wife traveled to the Soviet Union and also visited the Soviet Socialist Republic of Armenia, where he met with several Armenians he had befriended in Berlin in 1918–1920. Based on his journey, Wegner authored Five Fingers Over You, the success of which made him a celebrity. The text described the underlying political violence of the Soviet Communist model, foretelling the advent of Stalinism.

=== Nazi era ===
On April 11, 1933, shortly after the Nazi boycott of Jewish businesses, Wegner denounced the persecution of Jews in Germany in an open letter to Adolf Hitler. In this letter he criticized the boycott of April 1 and the subsequent anti-Semitic legislation. He advocated for the withdrawal of anti-Jewish laws and praised the role Jews had played for ages in Germany history. "Didn’t you yourself come to us from a neighboring country?" he even confronted the chancellor, who was born in Austria. "Lead the outcasts back to their jobs," he urged him, "the physicians to their hospitals, the judges to their courts, do not banish children from schools any longer, heal the worried hearts of the mothers and the entire population will be grateful to you."

On August 16, 1933, Wegner was arrested and taken to the Gestapo prison in Berlin. He was charged with pacifistic activities and the distribution of “horror propaganda”. During his one-day imprisonment here, he was tortured. Next day he was transferred to concentration camp Oranienburg, north of Berlin. On September 7, Wegner and some of his fellow prisoners were transported to camp Börgermoor, one of the so-called Emslandlager in northwestern Germany close to the Dutch border. After about six weeks, Wegner was transferred to the Lichtenburg concentration camp. On December 23, 1933, he were released as a result of the Christmas amnesty, proclaimed by Nazi leader Hermann Göring. In March 1934, Wegner was imprisoned for a short time again, in Leer, East Friesland.

After his imprisonment Wegner left for a short time to England, but returned to Germany. His wife and daughter emigrated to Palestine in 1936. The same year Wegner himself emigrated to the village Positano on the Tyrrhenian Sea in the Italian province of Salerno.

In 1939, Wegner and his wife mutually agreed to divorce. He would later suggest, "Germany took everything from me... even my wife." In 1945 he married Irene Kowaliska.

According to Stefan Ihrig, Wegner was a "broken man" by the 1960s. Ihrig suggests that all of Wegner's efforts ultimately failed, in particular due to the fact that he did not manage to save a single Jew from the Nazis.

=== Legacy ===
Memorials to Wegner

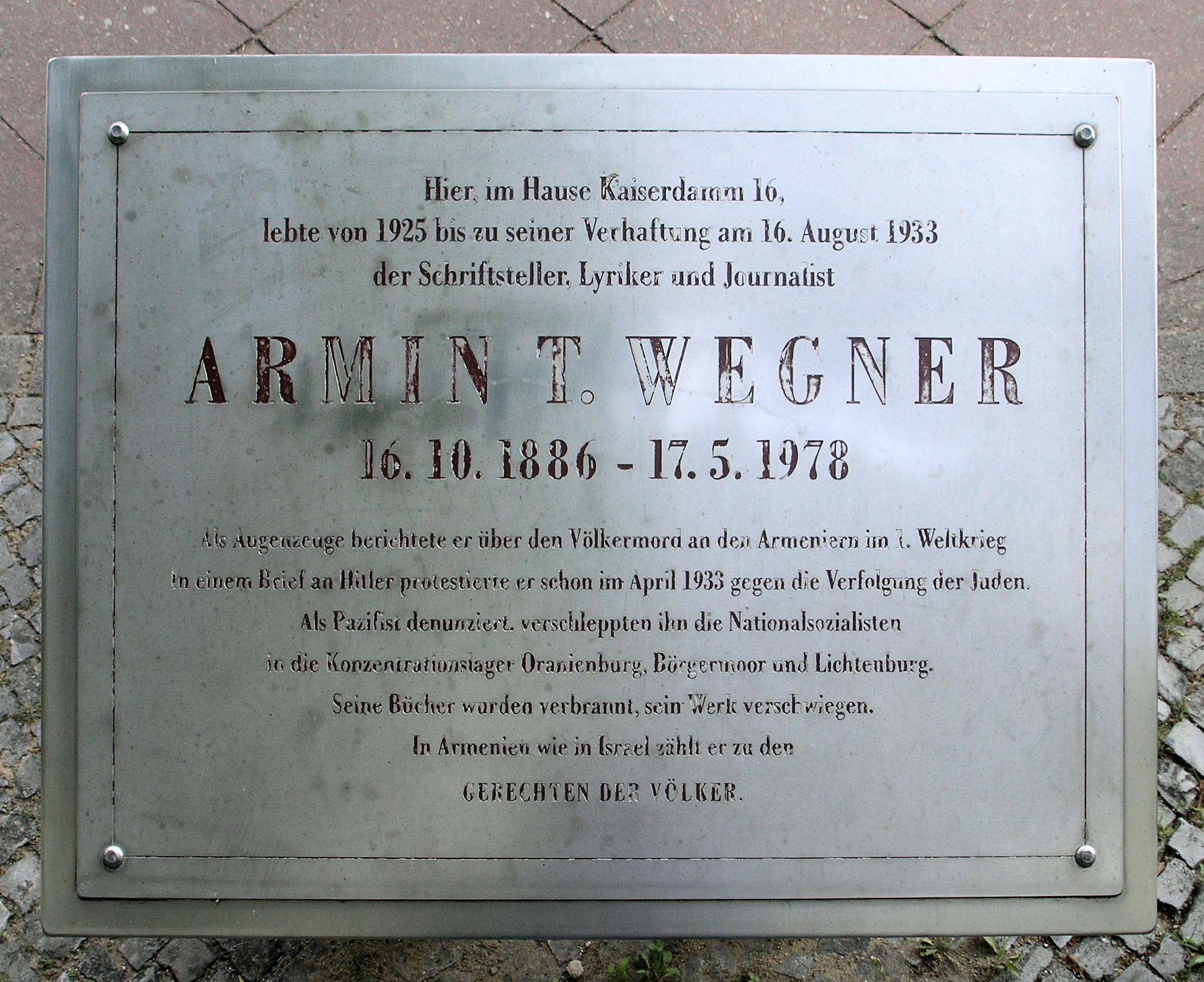
Memorial plaque of Wegner's residence in Kaiserdamm 16, Berlin-Charlottenburg, Germany

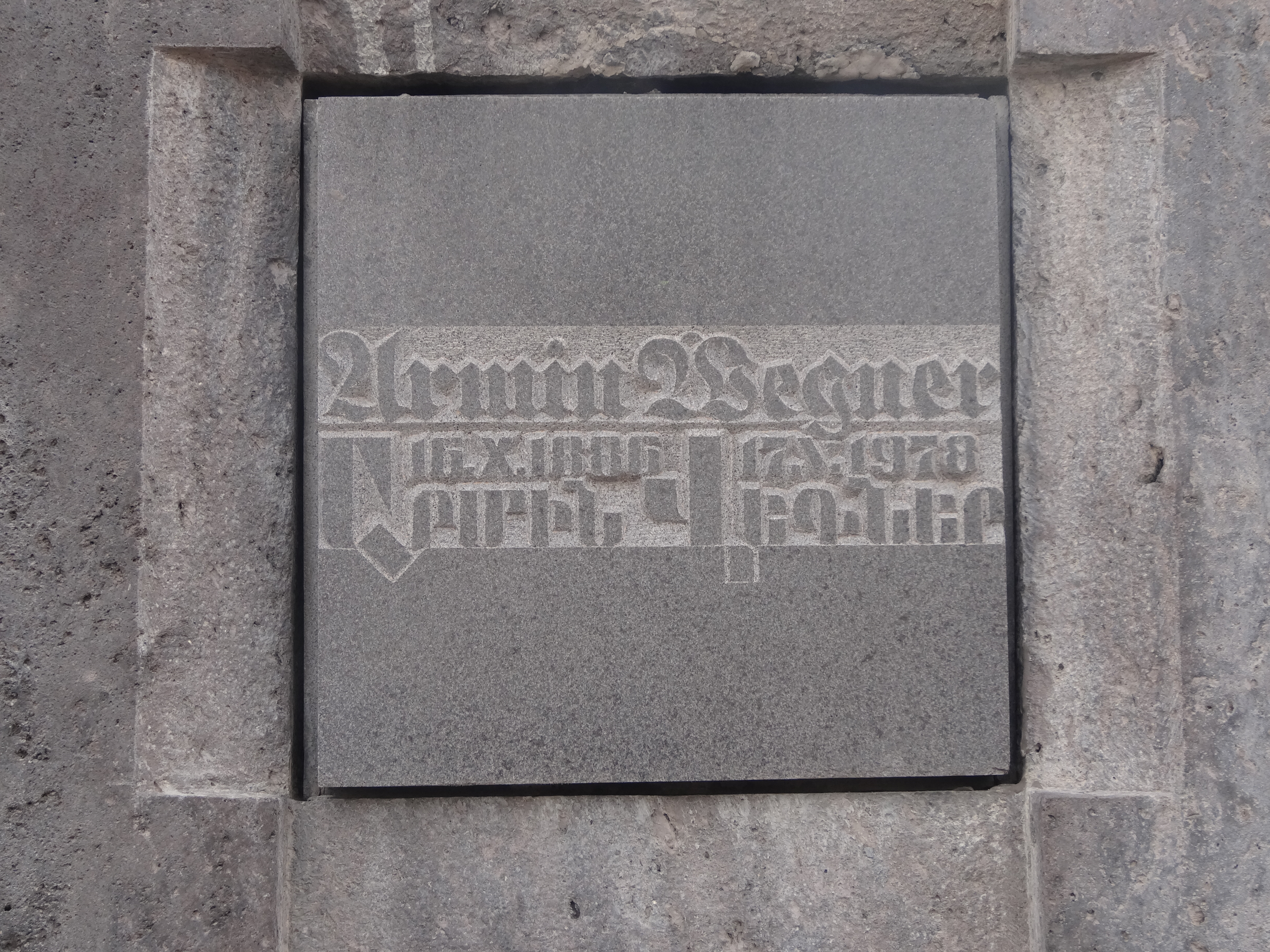
Yerevan, Armenia plaque

Wegner was awarded the Highest Order of Merit by the Federal German Government in 1956. His native city of Wuppertal awarded him the prestigious Eduard-Von-der-Heydt prize in 1962. In 1967 he was accorded the title of Righteous Among the Nations by Yad Vashem. A year later, he was invited to Armenia by the Catholicos of All Armenians and awarded the Order of Saint Gregory the Illuminator.

He died at the age of 91 in Rome. Some of his ashes were later taken to Armenia to be honored at a posthumous state funeral near the Armenian Genocide Monument's perpetual flame.

A 2000 documentary film, Destination: Nowhere (The Witness) directed by Carlo Massa and produced by Dr. J. Michael Hagopian, depicted Wegner's personal account of the Armenian genocide through his own photographs. Prior to the release of the documentary he was honored posthumously at the Armenian Genocide Museum in Yerevan for championing the plight of Armenians throughout his life.

Recalled by some as "the only writer in Nazi Germany ever to raise his voice in public against the persecution of the Jews", by the time of Wegner's death in Rome he had been "virtually forgotten" by the German people. He had never felt at home again in Germany after fleeing in the 1930s, and had lived out the remainder of his days in Italy. The inscription on Wegner's gravestone echoes the dying words attributed to Pope Gregory VII in 1085.

Amavi iustitiam odi iniquitatem / Propterea morior in exsilio
I loved justice and hated iniquity / Therefore I die in exile.

== See also ==
- Witnesses and testimonies of the Armenian genocide
