= Lola Landau =

Israeli poet writing in German

Lola Landau, birth name: Leonore Landau (Hebrew: לולה לנדאו; December 3, 1892 - February 3, 1990) was a German and Israeli writer, poet, and dramatist. She wrote in German and was member of the Association of German-Speaking Writers in Israel. While in Germany she was an active pacifist.

== Biography ==
Leonore Landau was born in Berlin to a family of noted Jewish gynecologist Theodor Landau (brother of gynecologist Leopold Landau) and Philippine née Fulda. Among her ancestors was a noted scholar in halakha rabbi Yechezkel Landau.

In 1915 she married philosopher Siegfried Marck and moved to Breslau (now Wroclaw, Poland), where she published her first poems. She had two sons with Marck. In 1920, after an intense affair, she divorced and married poet and pacifist Armin T. Wegner. Together with her sons, they moved to Neuglobsow, where her daughter Sybille was born in 1923. In 1925 they moved to Berlin. Wegner was not of Jewish descent. From October to February 1927/28 Landau and Wegner were among selected guests invited to the Soviet Union on the occasion of celebrations of the 10th anniversary of the October Revolution. Wegner wrote a travelogue book about this.

She moved to Palestine with her son Andreas and daughter Sybille in 1936 and settled in Jerusalem (her other son fled to Australia). Her husband (while already having a romance with artist Irene Kowaliska) initially followed her, but being at ethnic German, could not live neither in Nazi Germany, nor in Palestine, so he decided to settle in Italy, and in 1939 they divorced. Afterwards Lola had a relationship with noted mathematician Pessach Hebroni.

== Books ==
- Positano oder Der Weg ins dritte Leben, Berlin : Verlag Das Arsenal, 1995, ISBN 3-921810-62-0
- Vor dem Vergessen. Meine drei Leben ( Before oblivion. My three lives ), Berlin : Ullstein, 1992, ISBN 3-548-30285-8, an autobiography
- Leben in Israel, Deutsche Ausgabe: Marbach : Dt. Schillergesellschaft, 1987
- Die zärtliche Buche, Bodman/Bodensee : Hohenstaufen-Verlag, 1980
- Variationen der Liebe, Bodman (Bodensee) : Hohenstaufen-Verlag, 1973, ISBN 3-8056-2104-3
- Hörst du mich, kleine Schwester?, Bodman (Bodensee) : Hohenstaufen-Verlag, 1971, ISBN 3-8056-2103-5
- Noch liebt mich die Erde, Bodman (Bodensee) : Hohenstaufen-Verlag, 1969
- Abgrund, Berlin-Charlottenburg : Weltgeist-Bücher, (1926)
- Das Lied der Mutter, Charlottenburg : F. Lehmann, (1919)

== Awards ==
- 1989: Officer's Cross of the Order of Merit of the Federal Republic of Germany
