= Lambda expression =

Lambda expression may refer to:

- Lambda expression in computer programming, also called an anonymous function, is a defined function not bound to an identifier.
- Lambda expression in lambda calculus, a formal system in mathematical logic and computer science for expressing computation by way of variable binding and substitution.
