= Samuel Landauer =

German Jewish orientalist and librarian

Samuel Landauer (22 February 1846 at Hürben, Bavaria – 1937 in Augsburg) was a German Jewish orientalist and librarian.

Letter by Samuel Landauer (1932)

He received his education at the Yeshiva of Eisenstadt (Hungary), the gymnasium of Mainz, and the universities of Leipzig, Strasbourg, and Munich (Ph.D. 1872). In 1875, he became privatdozent of Semitic languages at the University of Strasbourg, and was appointed librarian there in 1884. In 1894, he received the title of Professor.

Landauer published:

- Psychologie des Ibn Sinâ, 1872
- Sa'adja's Kitâb al-Amânât, Leyden, 1880
- Katalog der Kaiserlichen Universität- und Landesbibliothek Strasburg, Orientalische Handschriften, 1881
- Firdusi Schahname, Leyden, 1884
- Die Handschriften der Grossherzoglich Badischen Hof- und Landesbibliothek in Karlsruhe, Orientalische Handschriften, 1892
- Die Masorah zum Onkelos, Amsterdam, 1896
- Themistius 'De cælo' (for the Aristoteles Commission of the Berlin Academy), Berlin, 1902.
