= Ludwig Roselius Museum =

Museum in Bremen

Coordinates: 53°04′30″N 8°48′21″E

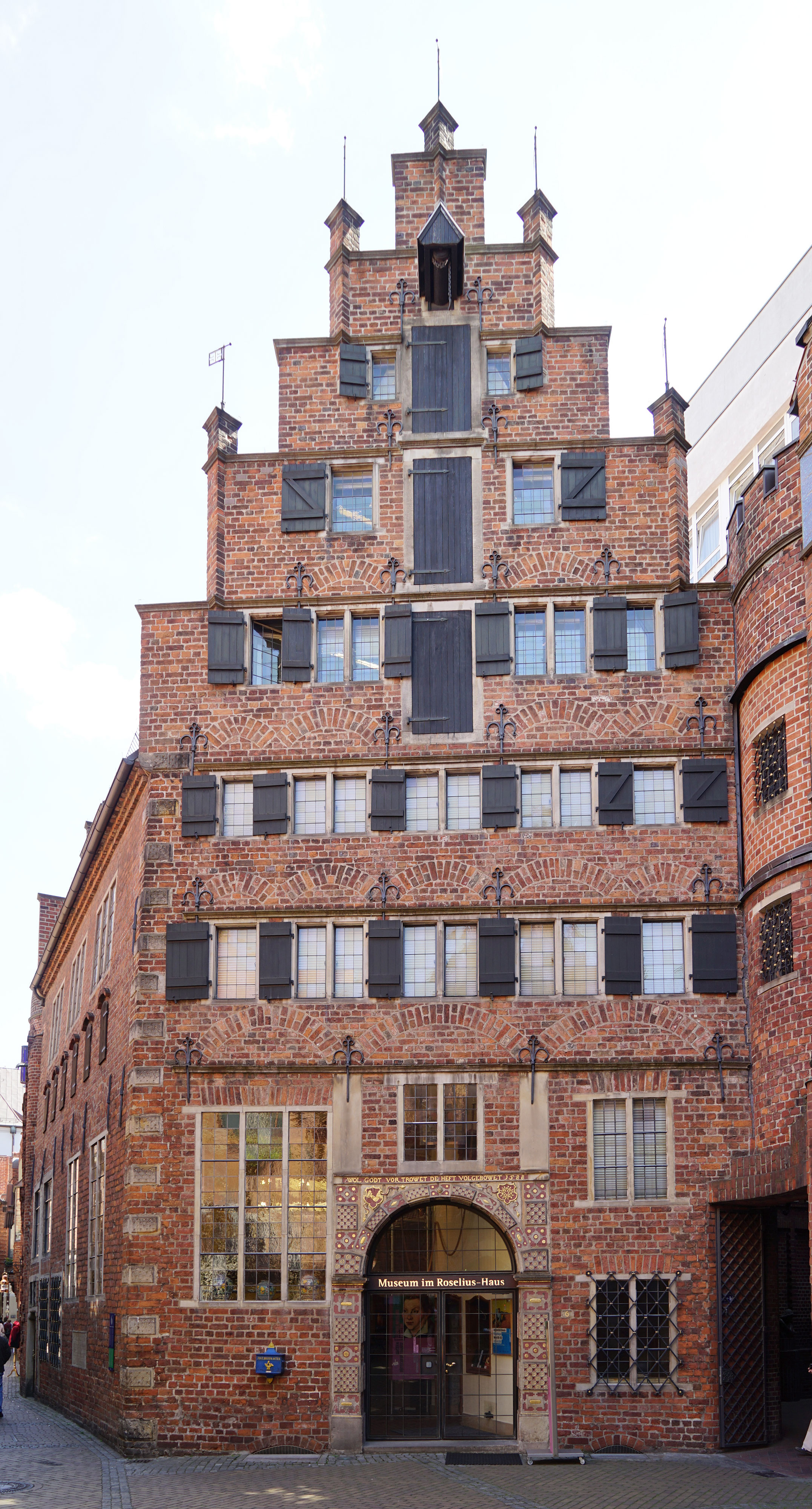
Ludwig Roselius Museum

The Ludwig Roselius Museum (German: Museum im Roselius-Haus) on Böttcherstraße in the old town of Bremen, Germany, houses the private collection of the successful coffee merchant Ludwig Roselius (1874–1943). Artefacts from the Middle Ages to the Baroque period are on display. The house itself which was completed in 1588 has a history going back to the 14th century.

== Background ==
The Roselius House which was completed in 1588 rests on foundations which appear to date from the 14th century, making it the oldest house on the historic Böttcherstraße which since the Middle Ages has linked the city's market square to the Weser. In 1902, Ludwig Roselius managed to purchase the centrally located No. 4. It soon became the head office of his business Roselius & Co. which in 1906 established Kaffee HAG (Kaffee Handels Aktien Gesellschaft). In 1928, Roselius expanded the building with an imposing stepped-gable section in order to accommodate his art collection. The building suffered serious war damage in 1944 but by 1954 it had been fully restored with the original materials.

== Museum ==
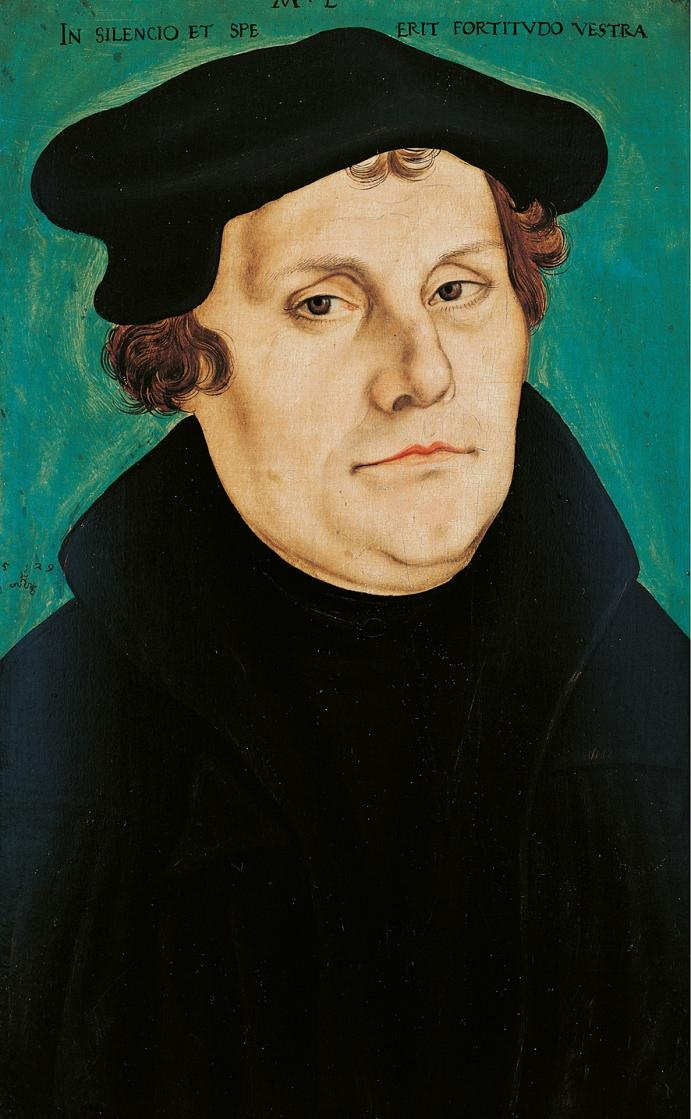
Lucas Cranach: Portrait of Martin Luther

The museum's collection which spans the period from the Middle Ages to the Baroque era includes medieval altarpieces, works by Ludger tom Ring (1522–1584) and Lucas Cranach (1472–1553), as well as the group of mourners (c. 1515) by Tilman Riemenschneider (1460–1531).

The large entrance hall houses a carved oak sculpture of Saint Christopher, the patron saint of seafarers (c. 1515). In addition to models of old vessels which traded on the Weser, the hall contains period furniture from the 17th and 18th centuries. The works in the Cranach Room include portraits of Martin Luther and his wife Katharina von Bora (both 1529).

The Oberlichtsaal, the former inner courtyard, houses religious works from the 14th to 16th century by artists such as Conrad von Soest and Joos van Cleve. The dining room (Esszimmer) covers Renaissance works from the 16th to 18th centuries while the Gothic Room (Gotischer Raum) is fitted out as a small chapel. Figures include a Madonna (c. 1520) by the Osnabrück Master.

The Treasury (Schatzkammer) contains works in silver on permanent loan from the Blackheads of Riga including a 1507 reliquary of St George (St. Georgsreliquiar) and a ceremonial Baroque jug depicting Saint Maurice on a hippocamp (Prunkkanne in Gestalt des Hl. Mauritius auf einem Hippokampen). The Staircase Hall (Treppensaal) with its tapestry, furnishings and Baroque paintings is reminiscent of a banqueting hall.

== Opening hours ==
Located at 6–10 Böttcherstraße, the museum is open to the public Tuesdays to Sundays from 11 am to 6 pm.

== Literature ==
- Aschenbeck, Nils (2008). Böttcherstrasse: ein exzentrisches Gesamtkunstwerk. Aschenbeck. ISBN 978-3-932292-62-0.
- Stamm, Rainer; Museum, Roseliushaus (Bremen, Germany). (2003). Die Gemäldesammlung des Museums im Roselius-Haus. Kunstsammlungen Böttcherstrasse. ISBN 9783980467780.
