= David Landau (screenwriter) =

David Landau is a screenwriter and filmmaker. His screenplay Seance won Niad Management's Be A Hollywood Screenwriter competition, and his pitch for a television program based on his company, "Murder to Go," won the 2003 People's Pilot contest. He won the Blackburn Award for Excellence in Playwriting for his comedy Deep Six Holiday.

With the publication of his The Mystery Express (1982), Landau is most often credited as the "inventor" of the interactive murder mystery. The play Murder at Café Noir is his most popular, having been performed over one hundred times across the United States.

In 1991, Murder at Café Noir was awarded the Orange Coast Magazine award for Best Dinner Theater. Both Murder at Café Noir and its sequel Noir Suspicions are published by Samuel French.

Landau received his bachelor's degree at Ithaca College and his MFA in Screenwriting from Goddard College. He currently teaches screenwriting at Fairleigh Dickinson University.

== Murder mystery plays ==
- Bullets for Broadway
- Contempt of Court
- Deadly Briefcase
- Killing Mr. Withers
- Mumm's the word
- Murder at Café Noir
- Murderous Crossings
- Murder Point Blank
- Murder: The Next Generation
- Noir Suspicions
- Spirits of Suscicion
- Virginia Jones and the Curse of Nergal
- Virginia Jones and the Inca Revenge
- The Altos: Like the Sopranos, only lower
